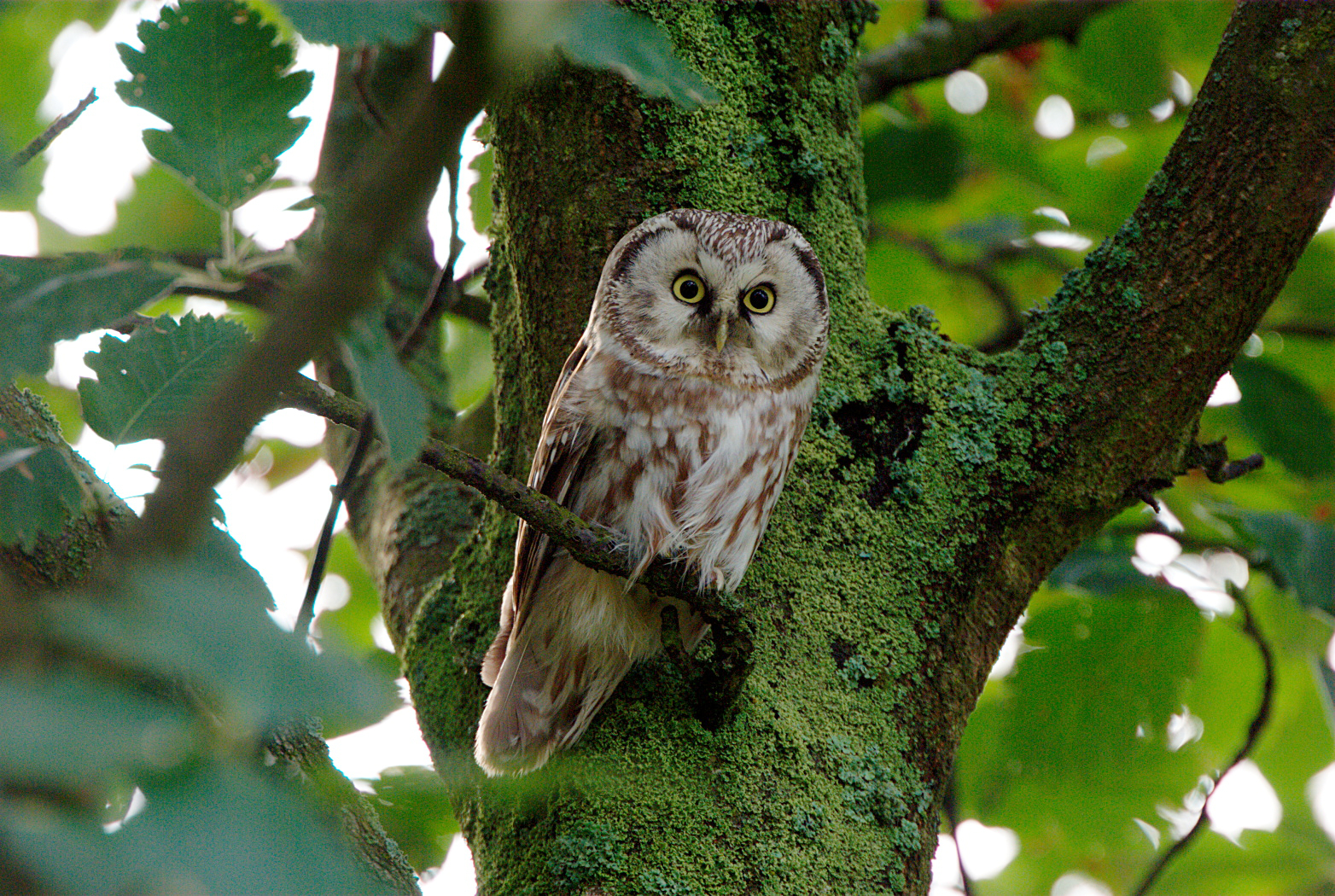
- A. f. funereus, Varberg, Sweden
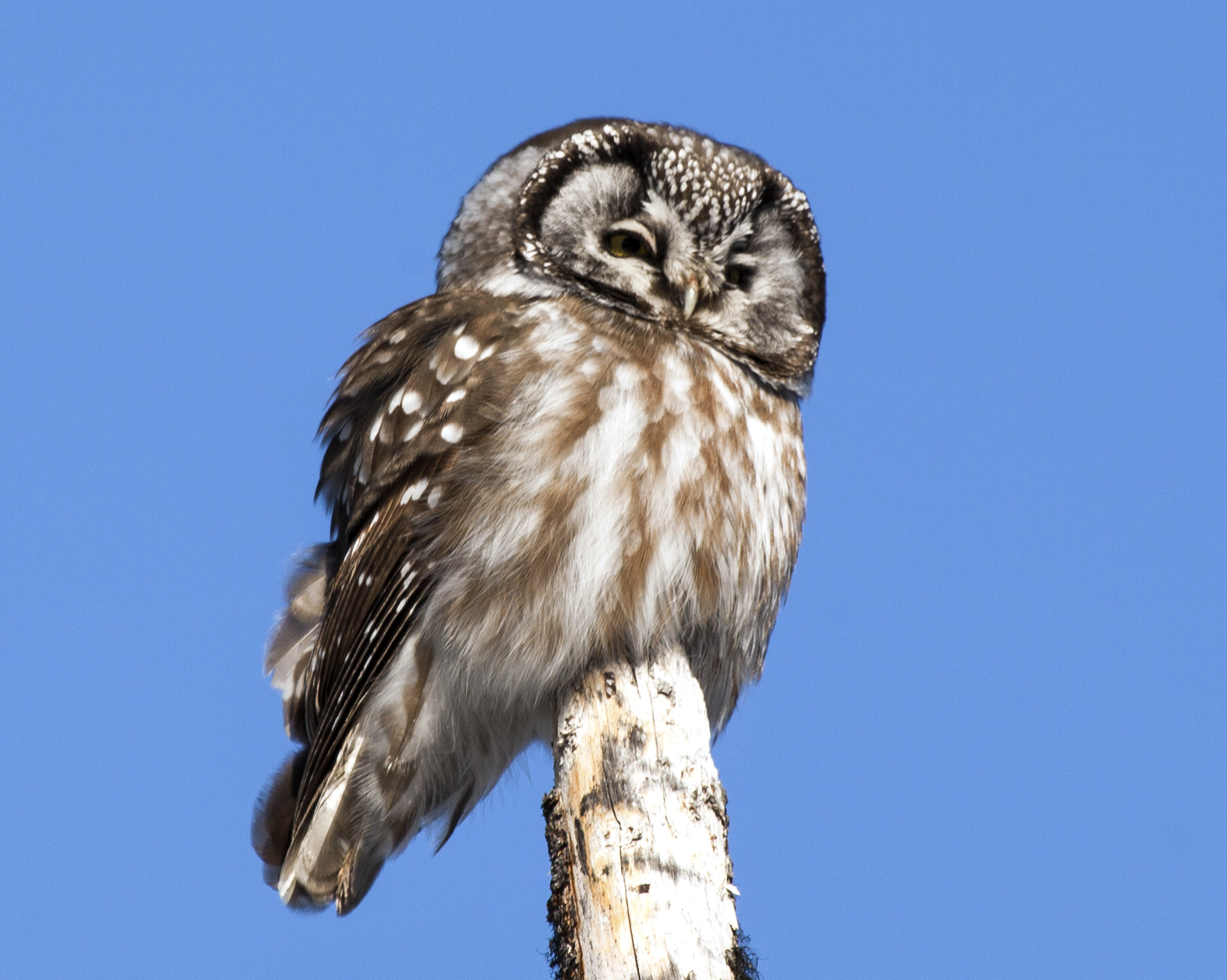
- A. f. richardsoni, Denali, Alaska

Conservation status
- Least Concern (IUCN 3.1)
- CITES Appendix II

Scientific classification
- Kingdom: Animalia
- Phylum: Chordata
- Class: Aves
- Order: Strigiformes
- Family: Strigidae
- Genus: Aegolius
- Species: A. funereus

Binomial name
- Aegolius funereus (Linnaeus, 1758)

Subspecies
- 7, see text
- Range of A. funereus Resident Non-breeding

Synonyms
- Nyctala tengmalmi (Gmelin, 1788); Cryptoglaux tengmalmi (Gmelin, 1788); Glaux funerea (Linnaeus, 1758); Strix funerea Linnaeus, 1758; Strix tengmalmi Gmelin, 1788

= Boreal owl =

Species of owl

The boreal owl or Tengmalm's owl (Aegolius funereus) is a small owl in the "true owl" family Strigidae. It is known as the boreal owl or, more rarely, Richardson's owl after Sir John Richardson, in North America, and as Tengmalm's owl in Europe and Asia, after the Swedish naturalist Peter Gustaf Tengmalm.

Due to its nocturnal habits and preferred inaccessible taiga forest habitat, it is rarely seen by humans; when met with, it is often extremely confiding, showing little or no fear of people, only flying off if approached to within 3–5 metres.

== Taxonomy ==
The boreal owl was formally described by the Swedish naturalist Carl Linnaeus in 1758 in the tenth edition of his Systema Naturae. Linnaeus placed it with all the other owls in the genus Strix and coined the binomial name Strix funerea. The boreal owl is now placed in the genus Aegolius that was introduced in 1829 by the German naturalist Johann Jakob Kaup with Strix tengmalmi J. F. Gmelin, 1788 (a synonym of A. f. funereus) as the type species.

=== Subspecies ===
Currently, seven subspecies are accepted, though there is no genetic basis for more than two subspecies, one (A. f. funereus, Tengmalm's owl) in the Old World, and one (A. f. richardsoni, boreal owl or Richardson's owl) in the New World. Some authors, notably the Ornithological Society of the Middle East, have recommended splitting the Old and New World populations as separate species due to significant differences in vocal behaviour, and genetics; but this has not yet been widely followed.

- New World
  - A. f. richardsoni (Bonaparte, 1838) – Alaska, northern Canada and north United States
- Old World
  - A. f funereus (Linnaeus, 1758) – nominate subspecies, from Scandinavia down south to the Pyrenees and east to the Urals, but not the Caucasus Mountains
  - A. f. magnus (Buturlin, 1907) – northeast Siberia
  - A. f. sibiricus (Buturlin, 1910) – southeast and south Siberia
  - A. f. pallens (Schalow, 1908) – west and central Siberia, south to the central Asian mountains in Kyrgyzstan
  - A. f. caucasicus (Buturlin, 1907) – Caucasus Mountains, and locally in northern Turkey and the Alborz
  - A. f. beickianus Stresemann, 1928 – northwest India to southwest China

=== Related species ===
It is the only species in its genus in Europe and Asia. Congeners in the New World include northern saw-whet owl (A. acadicus) in southern Canada and the United States (with some overlap in range), unspotted saw-whet owl (A. ridgwayi) in southern Mexico and Guatemala, and buff-fronted owl (A. harrisii) in South America.

=== Fossil history ===
Remains of the boreal owl dating back to the Pleistocene era were found in a cave in southern New Mexico. Bones were found in a pueblo in north-central New Mexico that has been inhabited from around 1250 CE to the present.

== Etymology ==
The genus name is Latin for a screech owl; the word came from the Ancient Greek aigōlios meaning "a bird of ill omen". The specific epithet funereus is Latin meaning "funereal".

== Description ==
The boreal owl is small with a large head and long wings. Both sexes are similar in appearance, though females are larger. Males typically measure 21–25 cm (8–10 in) in length, with a wingspan of 55–58 cm (22–23 in), while females are larger, 25–28 cm (10–11 in), with a wingspan of 59–62 cm (23–24 in). Females, weighing 132–215 g (4.7–7.6 oz), are heavier than males, which weigh 93–139 g (3.3–4.9 oz).

=== Adult identification ===
The plumage is brown above, with conspicuous pearly-white spots on the back and wings (giving it its Danish name of perleugle, "pearl owl"), and whitish underparts with rust-coloured streaks. Its large head has yellow eyes and an olive-brown crown with small white droplets and larger central spots. The dull white facial disc is framed with a dark border and white "eyebrows" often described as giving the owl a "surprised" expression. The underparts are cream-white with russet-brown streaks, while the tail has olive-brown feathers with narrow bars. Flight feathers are dark olive-brown with contrasting white spots. The primaries typically have up to five rows of white spots, while the tail has three distinct rows of spots. Unlike other owl species, these spots remain separated even when the tail is folded closely together. The beak is light yellow, rather than dark like its relative the northern saw-whet owl. The ears are asymmetrical in multiple bones, which enhances their hunting success. The flight is relatively noiseless and straight.

=== Juvenile identification ===
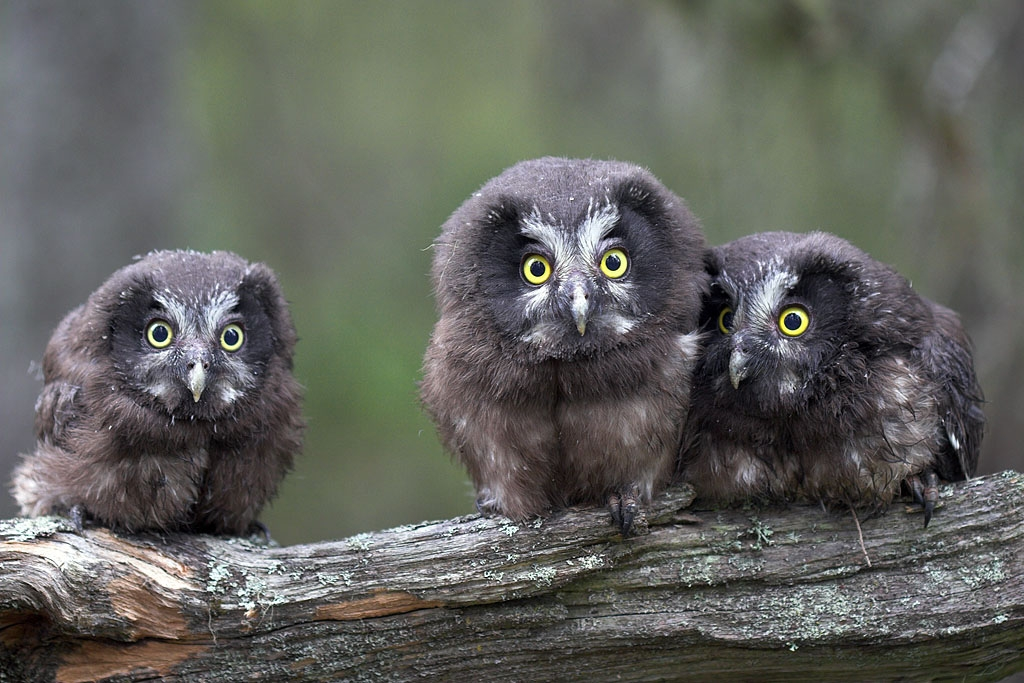
Juvenile A. f. funereus, Sweden

Juveniles, at about 3 weeks old, have a completely dull, chocolate-brown upperparts and underparts, with a dark brown facial disc bordered by black and white markings near the bill. Upon fledging, their plumage remains similar but with white markings on the neck, scapulars, flight feathers, and tail. They develop a broad white "X" between the eyes and distinct white streaks along the face, with cream-coloured belly and flanks streaked in dark grey-brown.

=== Moults ===
Boreal Owls have two primary moulting phases. The first, post-juvenile moult occurs around the age of two months, between August and September. It only affects the head, body, and wing coverts. The flight feathers, tertials, greater primary coverts, and tail are unaffected. Subsequent moults are also partial, affecting all of the head, body, and wing coverts, as well as the tail, but only a portion of the flight feathers, which are replaced in a specific order each year; the sequence of the primary moult not yet fully understood. Males in Idaho moult from June to October, while females do so from May to October.

== Vocal behaviour ==
A. f. funereus calling, Czech Republic

Calls and related functions can be challenging to interpret because of their nocturnal and hard to locate lifestyle. Starting at one week old, young owls produce a harsh "peep" or "chirp" that softens after fledging. Comprehensive studies in North America have found 8 different types of calls that play an important role in communication, mating, and territorial behaviour:

- The Primary Song – loud trill sung by males to attract females and establish territory
- The Prolonged Song – softer courtship melody sung by males from beginning of courtship to incubation to strengthen bonds
- The Delivery Call – soft call by male to signal the transfer of prey to a female or young
- The Screech – a load contact call made while flying or from a perch
- The Peeping Call – soft calls by females throughout breeding to respond to males' calls
- The Weak Call – single note repeated rapidly from females in nest after hatching
- The Chuuk Call – harsh response call by females on male's territory
- The Hiss Call – defensive call by females when the nest is disturbed

Bill clapping is used as a protective sound by both adults and juveniles, and is frequently associated with vocal hiss. Young develop bill clapping at least one week before fledging. Adults reply with a bill clap when humans handle them or enter the nest cavity.

Calls are similar in sound to the "winnowing" of the North American Wilson's snipe.

== Distribution and habitat ==
The boreal owl breeds in dense boreal, subalpine forest as well as mixed woodland. The preferred habitats are old-growth forests as they provide shelter from avian predators and an abundance of prey. Breeding habitats include boreal forests of black spruce, white spruce, birch, and aspen across northern North America and the Palearctic, and in mountain ranges such as the Alps and the Rockies. Nests can be found in aspen and mixed forests, while individuals roost in conifers of about 6 metres high. This species can travel long distances but are known to breed within 500 metres of their natal sites. Males have a higher site fidelity than females and occupy stable year-long home ranges. However, northern populations may migrate south in response to snow depth and poor prey availability, but eventually return to their breeding grounds.

== Behaviour ==
=== Breeding ===
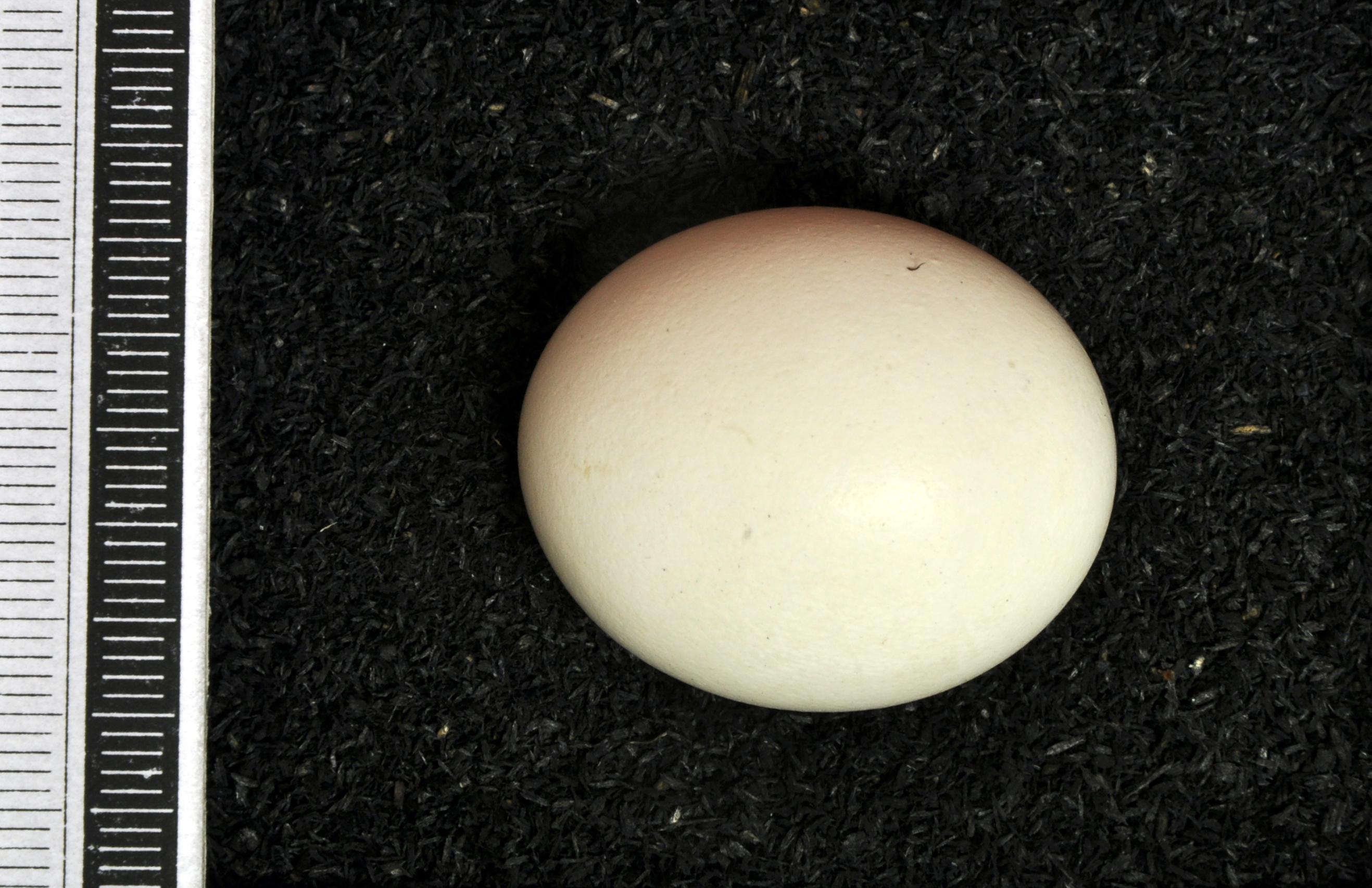
Egg, Collection Museum Wiesbaden

Boreal owls are monogamous and raise a single brood once they reach one year of age. The breeding begins with a lengthy courtship process where males sing for up to 102 days, starting from mid-February to mid-April, depending on environmental factors like prey availability and weather. The nest is usually a hole in a tree often made by a woodpecker, but the birds also readily use nest-boxes. Nesting period last for 28–36 days. The clutch is usually 3-7 eggs which are laid at 2-day intervals. They are glossy white and measure 33 mm × 26 mm (1.3 in × 1.0 in) and weigh around 11.7 g (0.41 oz). The eggs are incubated only by the female beginning with the second egg, and incubation lasts on average 29 days for the first egg and 2.6 days less for the last one. They hatch asynchronously after 25–32 days. Females take care of the young and brood the nestlings for an average of 21 days. Food is brought by males during the first 3 weeks to the nest, and females will tear apart the food for 2 weeks until young are able to eat unassisted. The young fledge after 28–36 days and become independent at 3 to 6 weeks outside the nest cavity. Breeding densities fluctuate based on prey availability, ranging from 0.6 to 26 nests per square kilometre across different regions.

=== Food and feeding behaviour ===
This small owl eats mainly voles and other mammals (such as mice, chipmunks, other squirrels, gophers, moles, shrews, and bats), but also birds as well as small amphibians, insects (such as beetles), and other invertebrates. In North America, they have been observed preying on southern red-backed voles, western heather voles, jumping mice, northern pocket gophers, and northern flying squirrels. Birds preyed upon include dark-eyed juncos, American robins, and redpolls. It is largely nocturnal, though in the northernmost parts of its range, it has to hunt during daylight because of the very short nights in summer. This species is an Ambush predator, meaning it does not pursue animals until they are within 10 metres of its hunting perch. Their extreme asymmetrical skulls leads to pinpoint sound in both horizontal and vertical directions, and allows them to capture prey under snow and dense vegetation.

=== Threats ===
==== Biological resource use – timber harvest ====
Logging activities have a negative impact on prey availability, foraging efficiency, and suitable nesting sites. Since the 1990s, significant population declines in northern Europe have been attributed to clear-cutting. Moreover, pesticides from agriculture and forestry effluents are damaging to the species' health. The slow forest succession in spruce-fir ecosystems disrupts the recovery of critical habitat, which impacts the species' ability to thrive. The decline of the black woodpecker (Dryocopus martius) in Eurasia has also led to a reduced number of nesting cavities.

==== Predation ====
Marten species (Martes spp.) and tawny owls (Strix aluco) are the predominant predators of boreal owl owlets and adult females at nest locations, with martens preying on 48% of Norwegian clutches. Other predators include American red squirrels (Tamiasciurus hudsonicus), Cooper's hawk (Astur cooperii), American goshawk (Astur atricapillus), Eurasian goshawk (Astur gentilis), great horned owl (Bubo virginianus), and ural owl (Strix uralensis). Moreover, Eurasian nuthatches (Sitta europaea) have been observed blocking the entrance of nests with mud, occasionally trapping females inside and starving them to death.

=== Mortality ===
Boreal owl mortality rates vary by region and age. In Idaho, adult annual survival rate was 46%, while in Finland, first-year males had a survival rate of 50%, and adult males 67%. Most fledgling males (78%) died before their first breeding attempt. Overall, adult survival ranges from 62% to 72% across studies. The average lifespan of breeding males is 3.5 years, and can go up to 11 years. Ringed boreal owls have been known to live up to 16 years.

== Conservation status ==
The current population trend is stable, with 730,000–1,810,000 mature individuals: the species is currently listed under Least Concern under CITES Appendix II, the EU Birds Directive Appendix I, and Raptors MoU Category 3. Nevertheless, the species' lifestyle makes it hard to monitor the decline in some subpopulations. The US Forest Service Regions 1, 2, 3, 4, and 9 designated the species as a "sensitive species". In Europe, systematic breeding surveys are being conducted in order to monitor its population status. Nest boxes are implemented to create suitable nesting sites and ensure reproductive success. The preservation of old-growth forests (with selective tree harvest to allow tree removal while maintaining suitable habitats) and protection of black woodpeckers (Dryocopus martius), which provide nesting cavities, are mandatory for the species' long-term survival.
