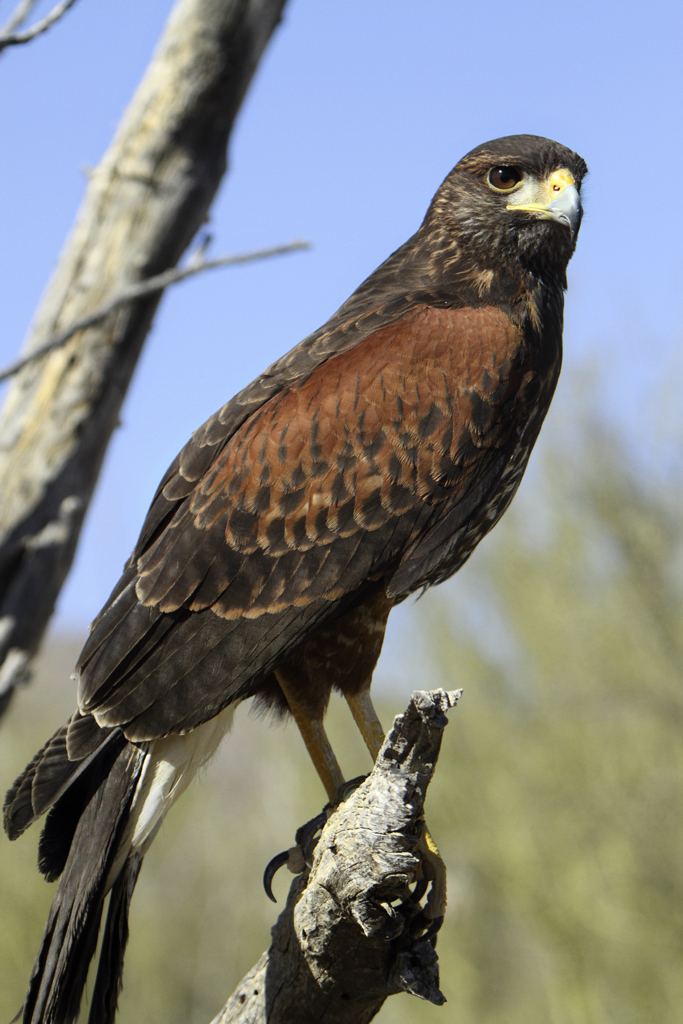
- P. u. harrisi in Arizona

Conservation status
- Least Concern (IUCN 3.1)

Scientific classification
- Kingdom: Animalia
- Phylum: Chordata
- Class: Aves
- Order: Accipitriformes
- Family: Accipitridae
- Genus: Parabuteo
- Species: P. unicinctus

Binomial name
- Parabuteo unicinctus (Temminck, 1824)

Subspecies
- P. u. harrisi; P. u. unicinctus
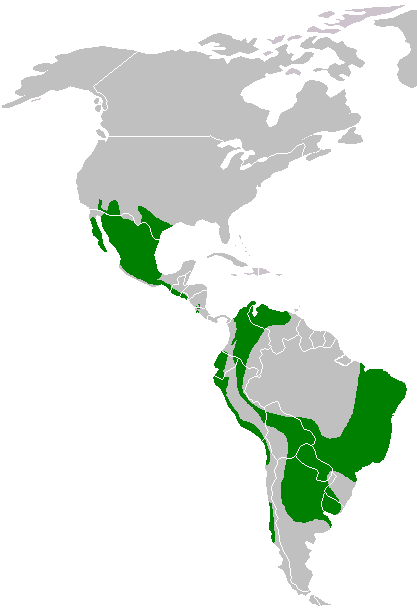
- Distribution map of Parabuteo unicinctus

Synonyms
- List: Falco harrisii Audubon 1839; Buteo harrisii Bonaparte 1839, Audubon 1840; Craxirex harrisii Coues 1870; Falco unicinctus Temminck 1824; Morphnus unicinctus Lesson 1828; Nisus unicinctus Cuvier 1829; Buteo unicinctus Gray 1844; Hypomorphnus unicinctus Cab. & Tschudi 1844; Spizageranus unicinctus Kaup 1845; Craxirex unicinctus Bonaparte 1854; Asturina unicincta Burm. 1855; Urubitinga unicincta Sclater 1871; Buteo unicinctus harrisii Coues 1872; Erythrocnema unicinctus Sharpe 1874; Polyborus tænurius Tschudi 1844

= Harris's hawk =

Parabuteo unicinctus

Species of bird

Parabuteo unicinctus is a medium-large bird of prey that breeds from the southwestern United States south to Chile, central Argentina, and Brazil. It contains two subspecies, the Harris's hawk (P. u. harrisi) and the bay-winged hawk (P. u. unicinctus). The species is also occasionally referred to as the dusky hawk and known in Latin America as the peuco.

Harris's hawk is notable for its behavior of hunting cooperatively in packs consisting of tolerant groups, while other raptors often hunt alone. Harris's hawks' social nature has been attributed to their intelligence, which makes them easy to train and has made them a popular bird for use in falconry.

== Etymology ==
The name is derived from the Greek para, meaning beside, near or like, and the Latin buteo, referring to a kind of buzzard; uni meaning once; and cinctus meaning girdled, referring to the white band at the tip of the tail. John James Audubon gave this bird its English name in honor of his ornithological companion, financial supporter, and friend Edward Harris.

== Taxonomy ==
Robert Ridgway placed Harris's hawk in its own new subgenus Urubitinga (Antenor) in 1873, and introduced the generic name Parabuteo in 1874. Richard Bowdler Sharpe also separated Harris's hawk to a monotypic genus, Erythrocnema, in 1874. In his Catalogue of Birds in the British Museum, Sharpe gives an extensive synonymy, with various authors having earlier placed P. u. harrisi in three genera and P. u. unicinctus in eleven.

=== Subspecies ===
There are two subspecies of Harris's hawk:

Image	Subspecies	Distribution
	Harris's hawk (P. u. harrisi)	Southwestern United States, Mexico, much of Central America, and western South America south to western Peru.
	Bay-winged hawk (P. u. unicinctus)	Eastern and southern South America.

The range of the two subspecies overlap in northern South America, coexisting as far south as Peru. It is unknown if they interbreed where they coexist. P. u. unicinctus is smaller than the northern subspecies, with proportionately longer tail and wings, and the adult's dark brown ventrum is streaked or flecked with white or whitish. Additionally, the wing underside of fully mature P. u. harrisi is completely dark in colour, while that of fully mature P. u. unicinctus is patterned and lighter in colour. The species has a white band at both the base of the tail and edge of the tail. These white bands are broader in P. u. harrisi.

A recent suggestion to raise these subspecies to species status was rejected by the South American Classification Committee, as the current body of knowledge of the subspecies' relation to each other was considered insufficient.

A third subspecies P. u. superior sometimes accepted in the past in the northwest of the species' range (Arizona to Baja California) was believed to have longer tails and wings and to be more blackish than P. u. harrisi; however, the sample size of the original study was quite small, with only five males and six females. Later research concluded that there is not as strong a physical difference as was originally assumed. Other ecological differences, and evidence of a latitudinal cline, were also brought up as arguments against the validity of the subspecies segmentation.

== Distribution and habitat ==
Harris's hawks live in sparse woodland and semi-desert, as well as marshes (with some trees) in some parts of their range (Howell and Webb 1995), including mangrove swamps, as in parts of their South American range. Harris's hawks are permanent residents and do not migrate. Important perches and nest supports are provided by scattered larger trees or other features (e.g., utility poles, woodland edges, standing dead trees, live trees, boulders, and saguaros).

The wild Harris's hawk population is declining due to habitat loss; however, under some circumstances, they have been known to move into developed areas.

== Description ==
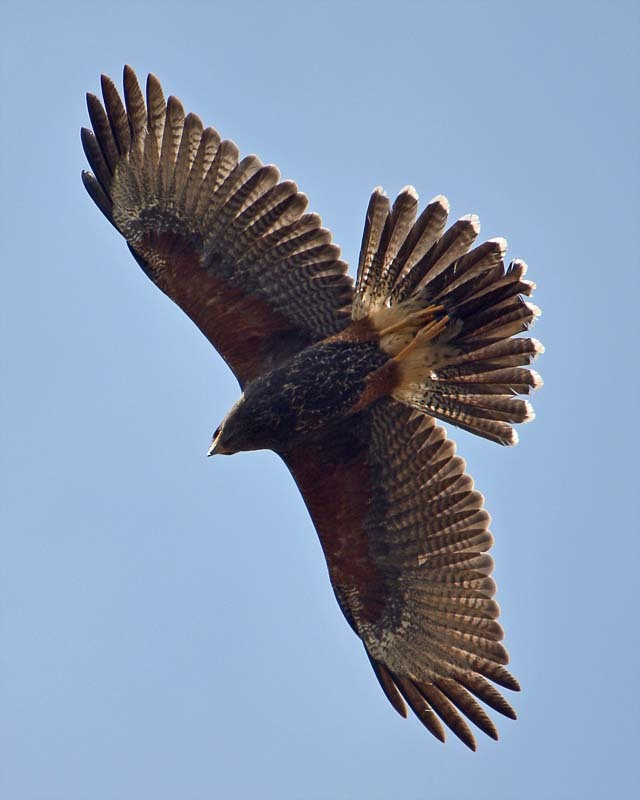
Young P. u. harrisi In flight, in Mexico

This medium-large hawk is roughly intermediate in size between a peregrine falcon (Falco peregrinus) and a red-tailed hawk (Buteo jamaicensis). Harris's hawks range in length from 46 to 59 cm (18 to 23 in) and generally have a wingspan of about 103 to 120 cm (41 to 47 in). These hawks have a brownish plumage, reddish shoulders, and tail feathers with a white base and white tip.

They exhibit sexual dimorphism with the females being larger by about 35%. In the United States, the average weight for adult males is about 701 g (1.545 lb), with a range of 546 to 850 g (1.204 to 1.874 lb), while the adult female average is 1,029 g (2.269 lb), with a range of 766 to 1,633 g (1.689 to 3.600 lb). They have dark brown plumage with chestnut shoulders, wing linings, and thighs, white on the base and tip of the tail, long, yellow legs, and a yellow cere. The vocalizations of Harris's hawk are very harsh sounds.

The lifespan of Harris's hawk is 10–12 years in the wild, though up to 25 years has been recorded in captivity.

=== Juvenile ===
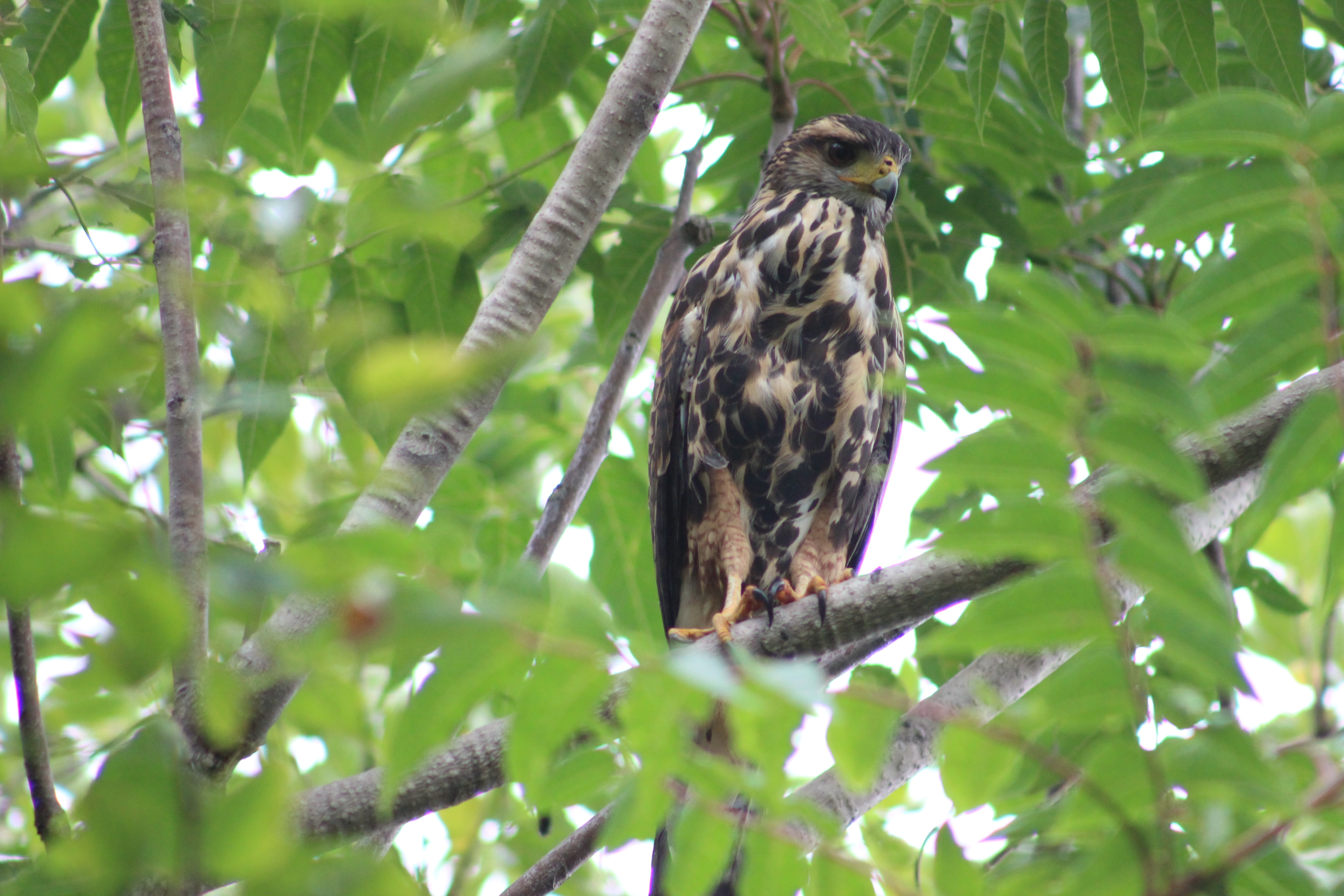
Juvenile, at La Plata, Argentina

The juvenile Harris's hawk is heavily streaked with white or buff on the underparts, and appears much lighter than the solidly dark-breasted dark adults. When in flight, the undersides of the juveniles' wings are buff-colored with brown streaking, and the primary feathers are whitish except at their tips, giving a pale panel on the outer wing; the tail band is also paler than on adults. They can look very unlike adults at first glance, but the identical chestnut plumage is an aid for identification.

== Behavior ==
Calling atop a saguaro, Mesa, Arizona

This species occurs in relatively stable groups. A dominance hierarchy occurs in Harris's hawks, wherein the mature female is the dominant bird, followed by the adult male and then the young of previous years. Groups typically include from two to seven birds. Not only do birds cooperate in hunting, but they also assist in the nesting process. No other bird of prey is known to hunt in groups as routinely as this species.

Social behaviour is most well documented in the northern subspecies P. u. harrisi. Individuals tend to be larger with more pronounced social behaviours in the southwestern U.S., where environmental conditions are harsher, than in the southeastern U.S.

P. u. unicinctus was once thought to be significantly less social than the northern subspecies, but increasing records of social behaviour in the subspecies since the late 1990s suggests a greater extent of sociality in the subspecies than previously recognized.

=== Breeding ===
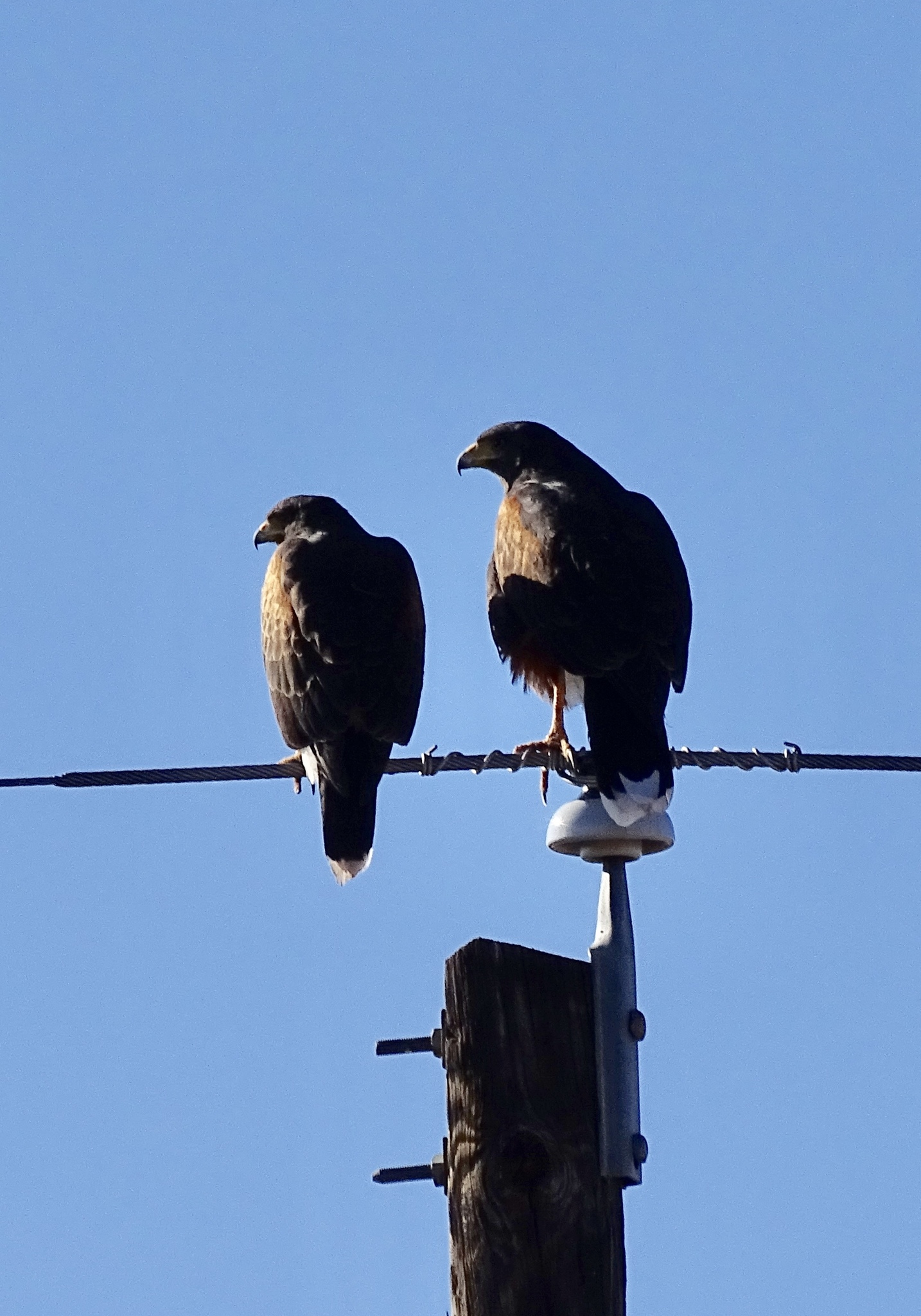
P. u. harrisi pair, showing the size dimorphism between the male (left) and female (right). In New Mexico.

They nest in small trees, shrubby growth, or cacti. The nests are often compact, made of sticks, plant roots, and stems and are often lined with leaves, moss, bark, and plant roots. They are built mainly by the female. There are usually two to four white to blueish-white eggs sometimes with a speckling of pale brown or gray. The nestlings start light buff, but in five to six days turn a rich brown.

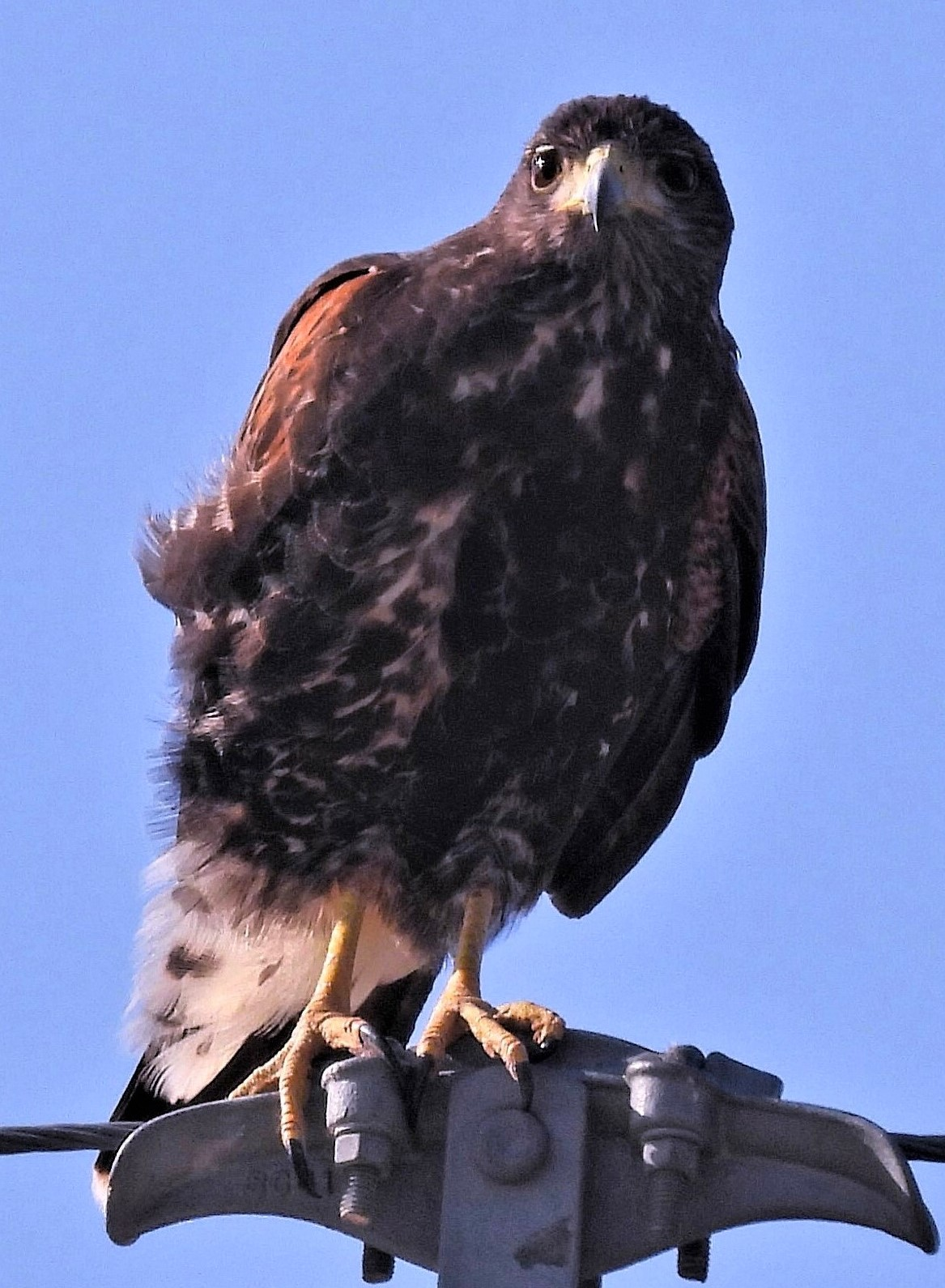
Adult of P. u. unicinctus in Argentina.

Very often, there will be three hawks attending one nest. This may include two males and one female. Whether or not this is polyandry is debated, as it may be confused with backstanding (one bird standing on another's back). Alternatively, they may consist of one male and two females. The non-breeding third bird acts as a helper for the pair, assisting with capturing prey, feeding chicks, and guarding chicks. The female does most of the incubation. The eggs hatch in 31 to 36 days. The young begin to explore outside the nest at 38 days, and fledge, or start to fly, at 45 to 50 days. The female sometimes breeds two or three times in a year. Young may stay with their parents for up to three years, helping to raise later broods. Nests are known to be predated by coyotes (Canis latrans), golden eagles (Aquila chrysaetos), red-tailed hawks (Buteo jamaicensis), great horned owls (Bubo virginianus), and flocks of common ravens (Corvus corax), predators possibly too formidable to be fully displaced by Harris's hawk's cooperative nest defenses. No accounts show predation on adults in the United States and Harris's hawk may be considered an apex predator, although presumably predators like eagles and great horned owls would be capable of killing them. In Chile, black-chested buzzard-eagles (Geranoaetus melanoleucus) are likely predators.

The subspecies P. u. unicinctus breeds year-round, and reaches its "definitive" plumage after 4 annual moults (≥ 45 months). Young birds have a heavily streaked pattern across the body. This streaking pattern reduces with each moult, until moulting into the definitive plumage, at which point the body becomes uniformly dark in colour with minimal patterning.

=== Feeding ===
The majority of Harris's hawks' prey are mammals, including ground squirrels, rabbits, and larger black-tailed jackrabbits (Lepus californicus). Birds from the size of small passerines such as diuca finch (Diuca diuca) to adult great egret (Ardea alba) and half-grown wild turkey (Meleagris gallopavo) can be taken. In one instance, a lone Harris's hawk successfully killed a subadult great blue heron (Ardea herodias). Reptiles such as lizards and snakes are additionally taken as well as large insects.

When hunting in groups, Harris's hawk can take large prey effectively, such as desert cottontail (Sylvilagus auduboni), the leading prey species in the north of Harris's hawk's range, usually weighing 800 g (1.8 lb) or less. Even adult black-tailed jackrabbits weighing more than 2,000 g (4.4 lb) can be successfully taken by a pack of Harris's hawks.

Because it often pursues large prey, this hawk has larger and stronger feet, with long talons, and a larger, more prominent hooked beak, than most other raptors of similar size. Locally, other larger buteonine hawks, including the ferruginous hawk, the red-tailed hawk, and the white-tailed hawk also hunt primarily cottontails and jackrabbits, but each is bigger, weighing about 1,200 g (42 oz), 1,100 g (39 oz) and 850 g (30 oz), respectively, more on average than a Harris's hawk.

In the Southwestern United States, the most common prey species (in descending order of prevalence) are desert cottontail (Sylvilagus auduboni), eastern cottontail (Sylvilagus floridanus), black-tailed jackrabbit (Lepus californicus), ground squirrels (Ammospermophilus spp. and Spermophilus spp.), woodrats (Neotoma spp.), kangaroo rats (Dipodomys spp.), pocket gophers (Geomys and Thomomys spp.), Gambel's quail (Callipepla gambelii), scaled quail (C. squamata), northern bobwhite (Colinus virginianus), cactus wren (Campylorhynchus brunneicapillus), northern mockingbird (Mimus polyglottos), desert spiny lizards (Sceloporus magister), and skinks (Eumeces spp.) In the tropics, Harris's hawks have adapted to taking prey of several varieties, including those like chickens and European rabbits introduced by man. In Chile, the common degu (Octodon degus) makes up 67.5% of the prey.

=== Hunting ===
While most raptors are solitary, only coming together for breeding and migration, Harris's hawks will hunt in cooperative groups of two to six. This is believed to be an adaptation to the lack of prey in the desert climate in which they live. In one hunting technique, a small group flies ahead and scouts, then another group member flies ahead and scouts, and this continues until prey is bagged and shared. In another, all the hawks spread around the prey and one bird flushes it out. Harris's hawks will often chase prey on foot and are quite fast on the ground; their long legs are adapted for this, whereas most other hawks do not spend as much time on the ground. Groups of Harris's hawks tend to be more successful at capturing prey than lone hawks, with groups of two to four individuals having ~10% higher success rates per extra individual.

== Relationship with humans ==
=== Falconry ===
Since about 1980, Harris's hawks have been increasingly used in falconry and are currently the most popular hawks in the West (outside of Asia) for that purpose, as they are easy to train and are very social.

Trained Harris's hawks have been used to remove an unwanted pigeon population from London's Trafalgar Square, and from the tennis courts at Wimbledon..

Trained Harris's hawks have been used for bird abatement by falconry experts in Canada and the United States at various locations including airports, resorts, landfill sites, and industrial sites, as well as in the pigeon-infested stations of the Bay Area Rapid Transit (BART) system

Harris's hawks have frequently escaped from captivity in Western Europe, especially Britain; they have occasionally bred in the wild, but have not to date become naturalized.

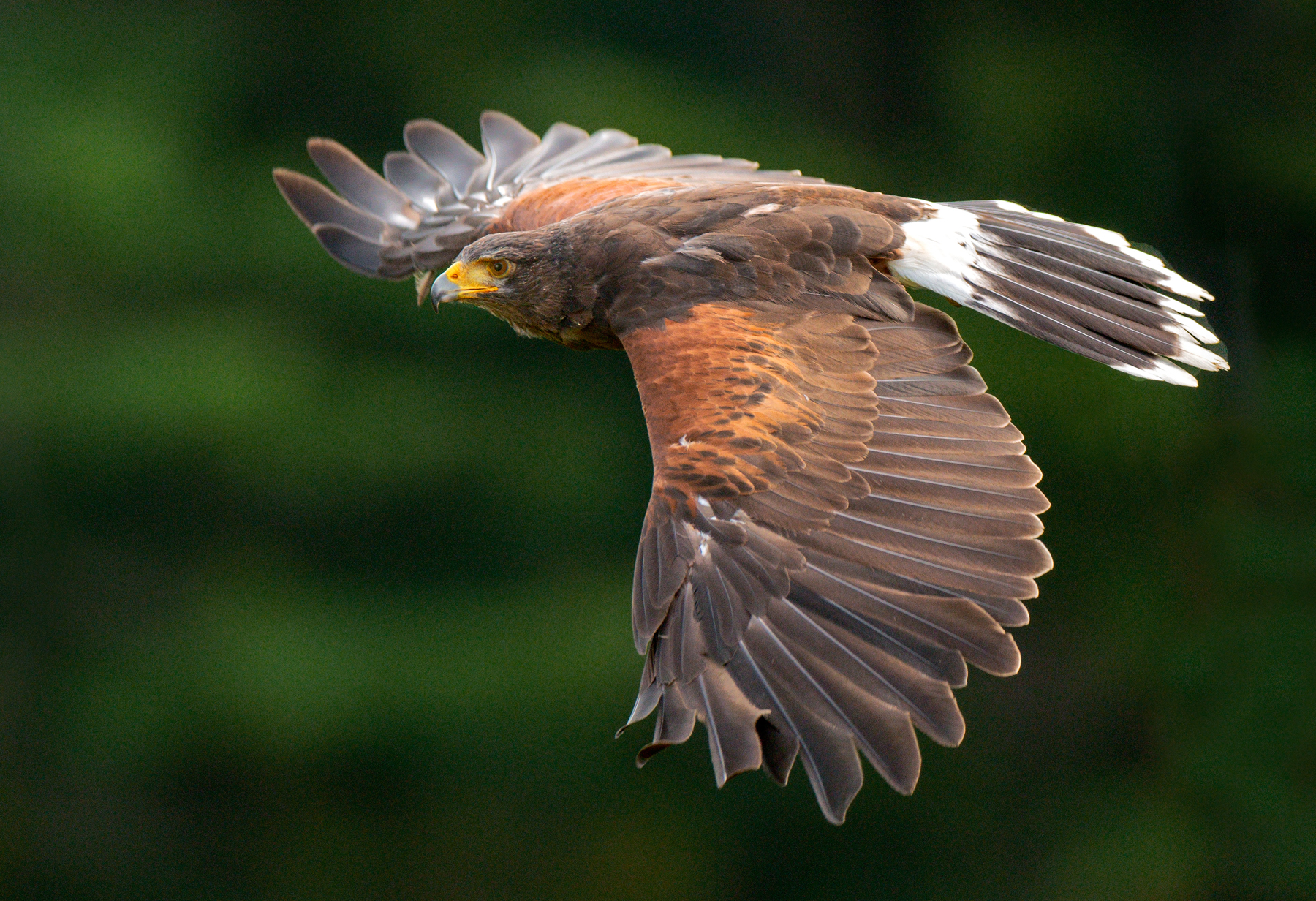
Harris's hawk in flight at a falconry centre

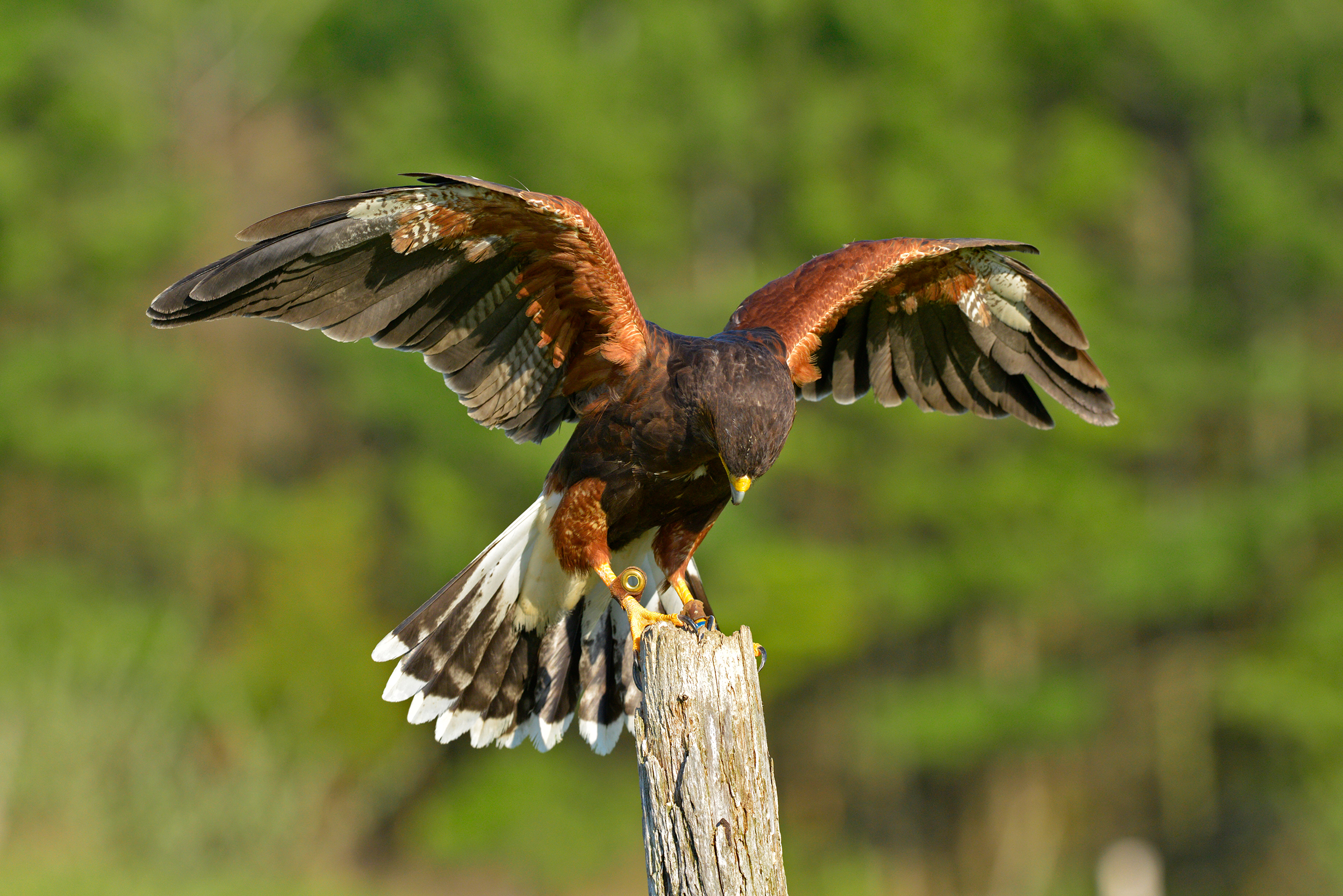
Harris's hawk at a licensed falconry centre, Ontario, Canada

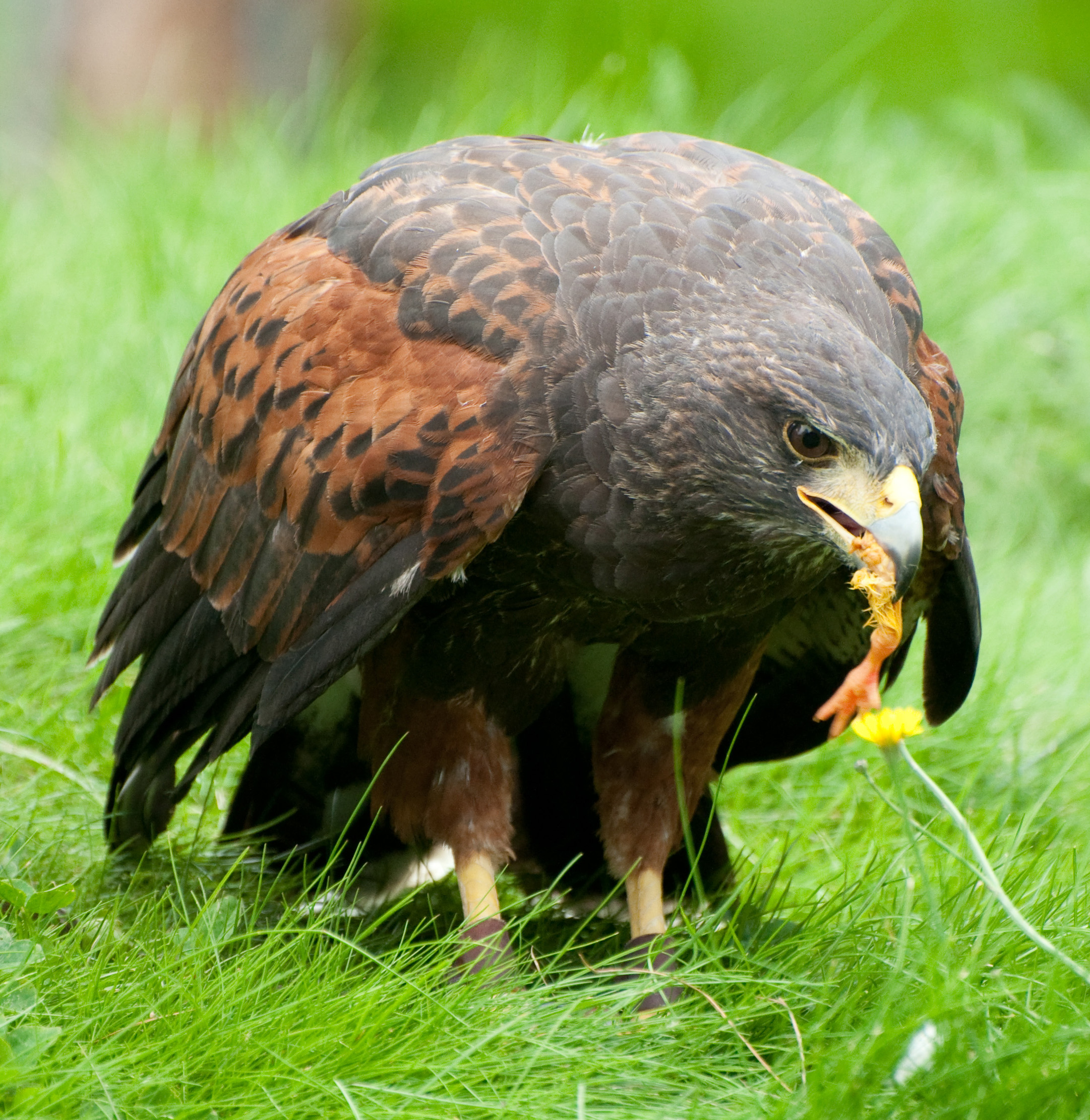
Eating a chick's leg

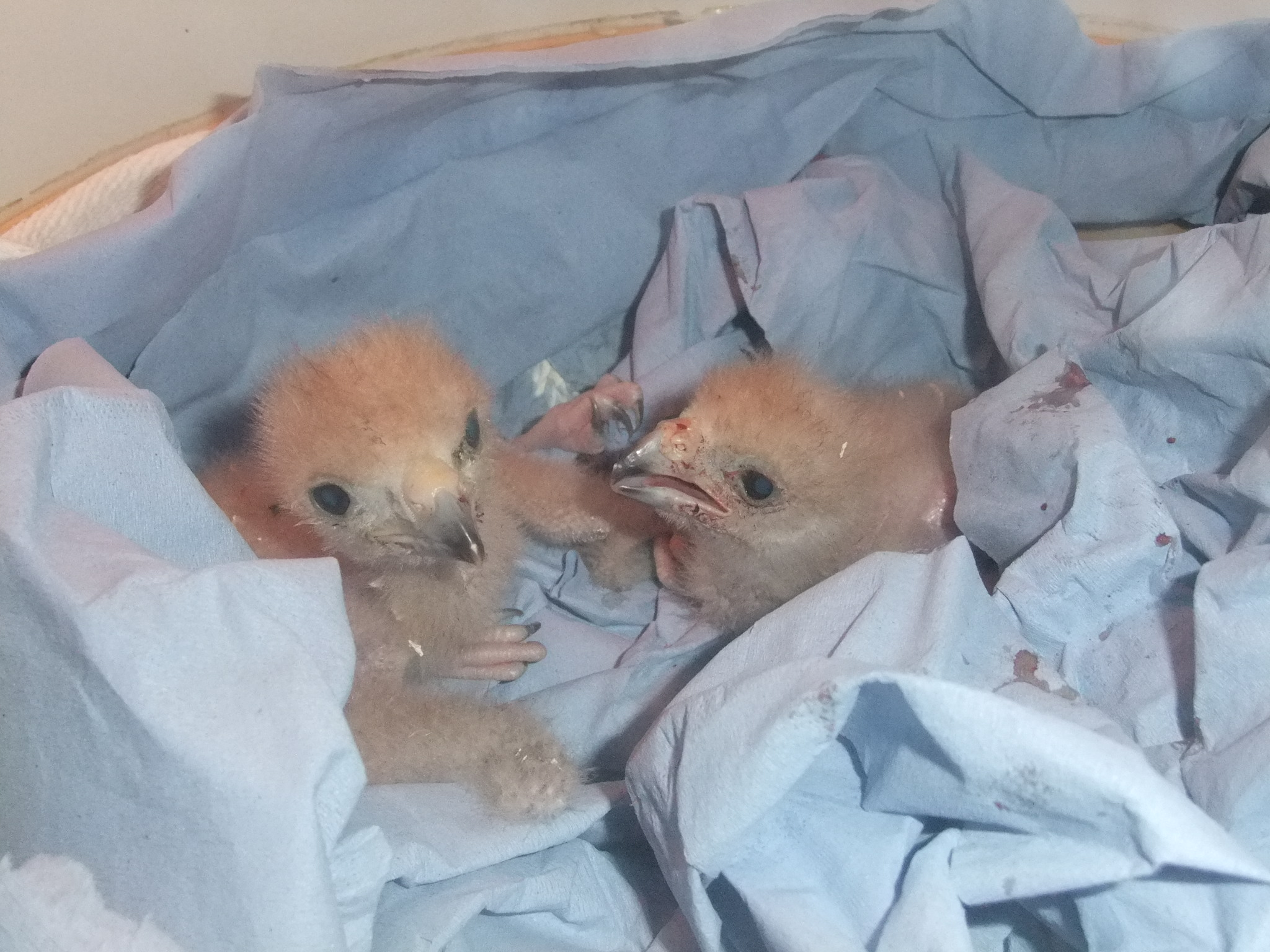
Week-old chicks in captivity

=== In art ===
John James Audubon illustrated Harris's hawk in The Birds of America (published in London, 1827–38) as Plate 392 with the title "Louisiana Hawk -Buteo harrisi". The image was engraved and colored by the Robert Havell, London workshops in 1837. The original watercolor by Audubon was purchased by the New York History Society where it remains to this day (January 2009).
