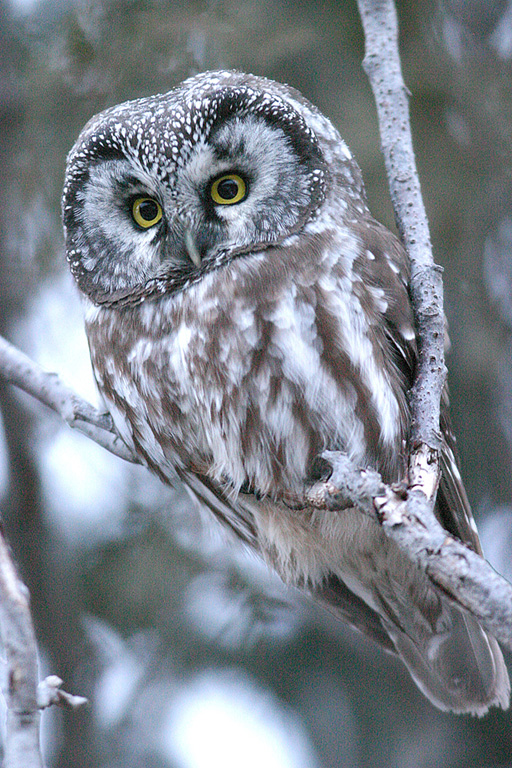
- Boreal owl (Aegolius funereus)

Scientific classification
- Kingdom: Animalia
- Phylum: Chordata
- Class: Aves
- Order: Strigiformes
- Family: Strigidae
- Subfamily: Surniinae
- Genus: Aegolius; Kaup, 1829

Type species
- Strix tengmalmi = Strix funereus Linnaeus, 1758

Species
- See text

= Aegolius =

Genus of birds

Aegolius is a genus of small true owls. The genus name is from Latin, aegolius, is a type of screech owl that was thought to be a bird of ill omen.

== Taxonomy ==
The genus Aegolius was introduced in 1829 by the German naturalist Johann Jakob Kaup with the boreal owl (Aegolius funereus) as the type species. The genus name is Latin for a screech owl, the word came from the Ancient Greek aigōlios meaning "a bird of ill omen". In Greek mythology, Aegolius was originally a man whom Zeus transformed into an owl.

== Species ==
The genus contains five species:

- Boreal owl or Tengmalm's owl, Aegolius funereus
- Northern saw-whet owl, Aegolius acadicus
- † Bermuda saw-whet owl, Aegolius gradyi (extinct)
- Unspotted saw-whet owl, Aegolius ridgwayi
- Buff-fronted owl, Aegolius harrisii

== Description ==
Aegolius owls are small, stout, short-tailed, and broad-winged, with large, round facial discs. The species varies from 18 to 27 cm in length. These owls take mainly rodents and other small mammals as their prey, but also feed on birds, bats, insects, and other invertebrates according to what is available. They are dark brown or black above, and whitish or buff below, marked with streaks or spots in the two northern forms. The head is large, with yellow eyes and a well-defined facial disc. The flight is strong, agile, and direct. They breed in tree holes, laying several eggs. They have repetitive whistling calls in the breeding season.

== Distribution ==
Three of the extant species are restricted to the New World, but the boreal owl has a circumpolar range through North America, Eurasia, the Alps, and the Rockies. Essentially nocturnal woodland owls of temperate or colder climates; the two northern species breed in North America's coniferous forests, and the unspotted saw-whet owl and buff-fronted owl (Central and South America, respectively) are species of mountain, cloud, or oak forests. They are mainly resident birds, but the northern species at least sometimes move south or to lower altitudes in autumn. The movements are difficult to monitor due to the problems of detecting these nocturnal owls outside the breeding season, when they are not calling.

== Mating system ==
Aegolius owls have a very diverse mating system containing multiple strategies. Although there are five species within this genus, one of which is extinct, the majority of the information known about the mating system is based on research from the boreal owl (A. funereus) and the northern saw-whet owl (A. acadicus) in North America. Both species have been shown to exhibit both monogamous and polygamous lifestyles with a focus on bigyny. However, the boreal owl has been shown to exhibit biandry as well.

=== Mate choice ===
Territorial call of the boreal owl (A.funereus)

==== Vocalizations ====
Mate choice in this genus is largely related to auditory vocalizations (a form of sensory exploitation). A quiet species through most of the year, the northern saw-whet owl male produces a bell-like or "series song" advertisement call. Generally, it can be heard early morning or on bright nights from March – May (the breeding season) to attract females. The calls are believed to be relatively different between individuals, suggesting they may play a role in individual identification by the females. After pairing with a mate, vocalizations are very limited and appear to be related to territory or offspring defence.

In contrast, the boreal owl produces a "staccato song" starting around dusk, and ending around midnight in the late winter and early spring. The call serves to attract females and becomes increasingly persistent as time without a mate passes. Some research suggests that unlike the Northern saw-whet owl, a variation of the male call persists after mating throughout the reproductive cycle for defense, aggression, or to convey information about prey. This suggests that vocalization may be used in this species beyond mate attraction and possibly as a contact call.

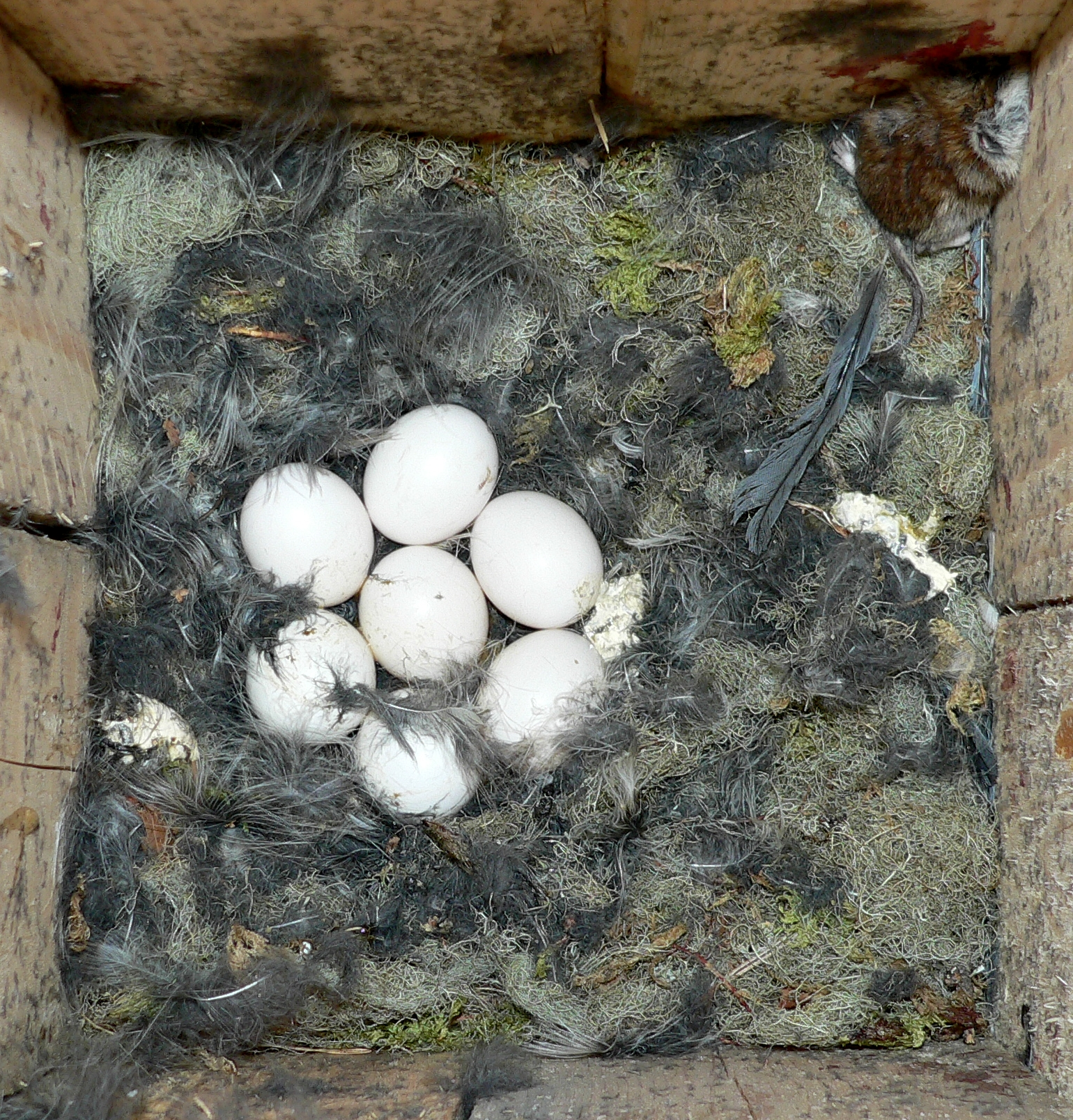
Typical boreal owl (A. funereus) nest

==== Nest and territory quality ====
Aside from vocalization, females in this genus may choose males based on nest or territory quality. For example, in boreal owls, the number and quality of nest holes or boxes defended by males is a factor in female reproductive effort. The number and quality of nests appear to serve a direct benefit to females (direct benefit hypothesis), as it provides protection from predation, as well as access to food resources, as good nest quality can be indicated by access to prey (i.e. small mammals). Female boreal owls' reproductive success can decline in polyterritorial polygamous situations, as females are unable to discriminate previously paired and unpaired males (also known as the deception hypothesis). It is also important to note that increasing polygamy levels leads to decreased reproductive success in secondary females. Limited research has been conducted into mate choice of the Northern saw-whet owl in relation to territory quality. Some researchers suggest they follow a similar trend to boreal owls, where the quality of nests is a direct benefit to the female and therefore a determining factor. Northern saw-whet owls' nest locations appear less linked to the availability of small mammals, as they have a greater variety of prey options and tend to be more nomadic after each breeding season.

==== Reversed size dimorphism ====
Lastly, size of males may play a role in mate choice in some species. The males in this genus provide direct benefit to females such as protection, territory, and resources. As a result, large male size (and smaller female size) would theoretically be more advantageous. However, in the boreal owl, this is not the case. Females tend to be larger and heavier than the male mates they choose, some suggesting this is the result of the starvation hypothesis (selection acts on females to increase ability to withstand long periods of time without food in polygamous lifestyles). Another theory suggests that females purposely choose short-winged, light males, as they would be able to hunt at lower energetic costs and compete for territory more efficiently than larger, long-winged individuals. This would provide the female with greater material benefits for her offspring. Reversed size dimorphism is also observed in northern saw-whet owls, but the differences are much more difficult to observe, as the species is smaller overall; the role of this in mate choice is unclear.

=== Contests ===
Relating to the observed size dimorphism in males, most species compete for territory in this genus, as it indirectly relates to better female mates. The intraspecific competition tends to be dependent on individual flight ability, individuals that can fly more efficiently and effectively tend to get better territory. However, interspecific competition also plays a role. Species in this genus are often smaller than other owls that have similar ranges; as a result, they often are outcompeted for territory by other species. This is especially true in boreal owls, as their range overlaps with the much larger Ural (Strix uralensis) and Eurasian eagle owls (Bubo bubo). As a result, when these species are present, the boreal owl often mates with less desirable subdominant females.

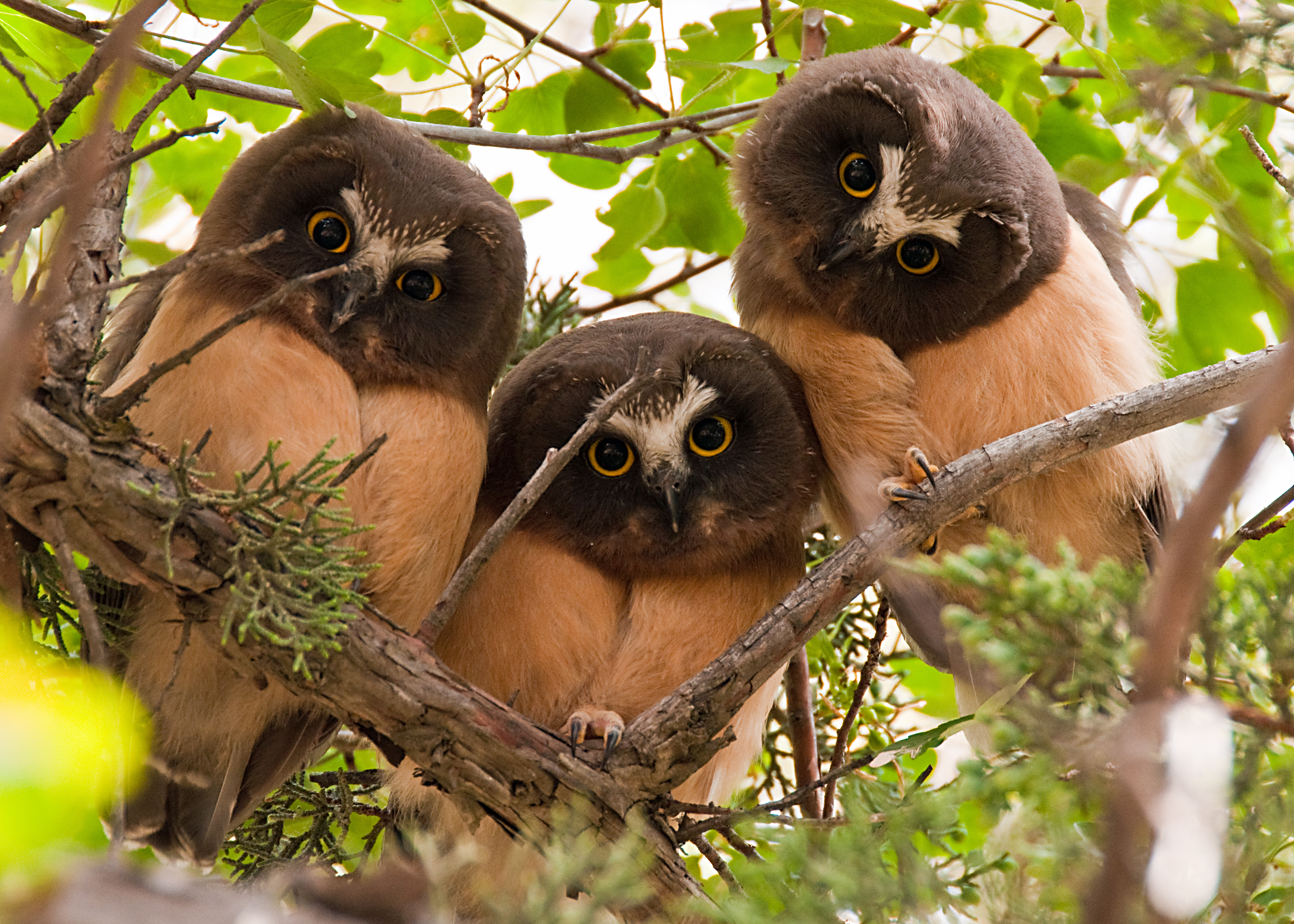
Northern saw-whet owl (A.acadicus) juveniles.

=== Parental care ===
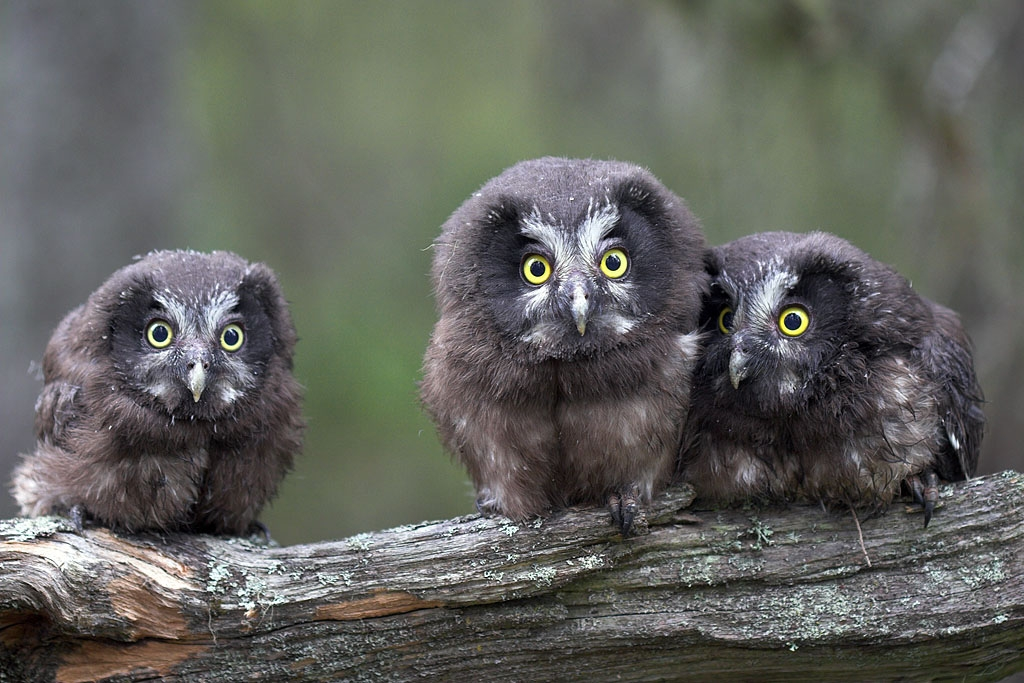
Boreal owl juveniles

Parental care in the boreal and northern saw-whet owls is quite similar; females incubate and brood eggs, while males often provide protection, and resources such as food and nesting sites. This trend likely applies across the species in this genus, as some species may be conspecifics (i.e. northern saw-whet and unspotted saw-whet owls).

In boreal owls, the level of investment provided by the male is directly related to the level of parental care effort in brooding by the female. Increased resources (i.e. food) provided by the male during the nesting stage increases female effort in brooding of the offspring. This is similar to the differential allocation hypothesis, which suggests that females increase their reproductive effort overall when offspring are the result of ideal mates. Brooding behavior is key to the success of owl fledglings, so when males provide adequate food, females provide adequate care. Fewer or lighter individual fledglings are produced as polygamy rate increases and the amount of male effort becomes increasingly important in predicting female brooding effort.

Information on parental care effort is limited on the northern saw-whet owl, and likely related to male provisioning rates, the extent, however, is unclear. Current research examines the effect of habitat loss on the male provisioning rates.
