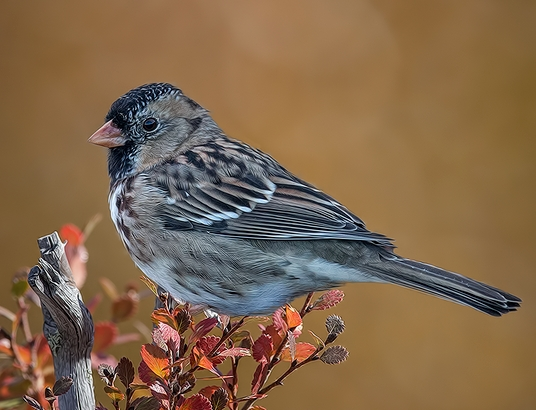
- Breeding plumage, Ennadai Lake, Nunavut

Conservation status
- Near Threatened (IUCN 3.1)

- Secure (NatureServe)

Scientific classification
- Kingdom: Animalia
- Phylum: Chordata
- Class: Aves
- Order: Passeriformes
- Family: Passerellidae
- Genus: Zonotrichia
- Species: Z. querula

Binomial name
- Zonotrichia querula (Nuttall, 1840)
- Range of Z. querula Breeding Migration Nonbreeding

= Harris's sparrow =

Harris's sparrow Temporal range: Late Pleistocene–present

Species of bird

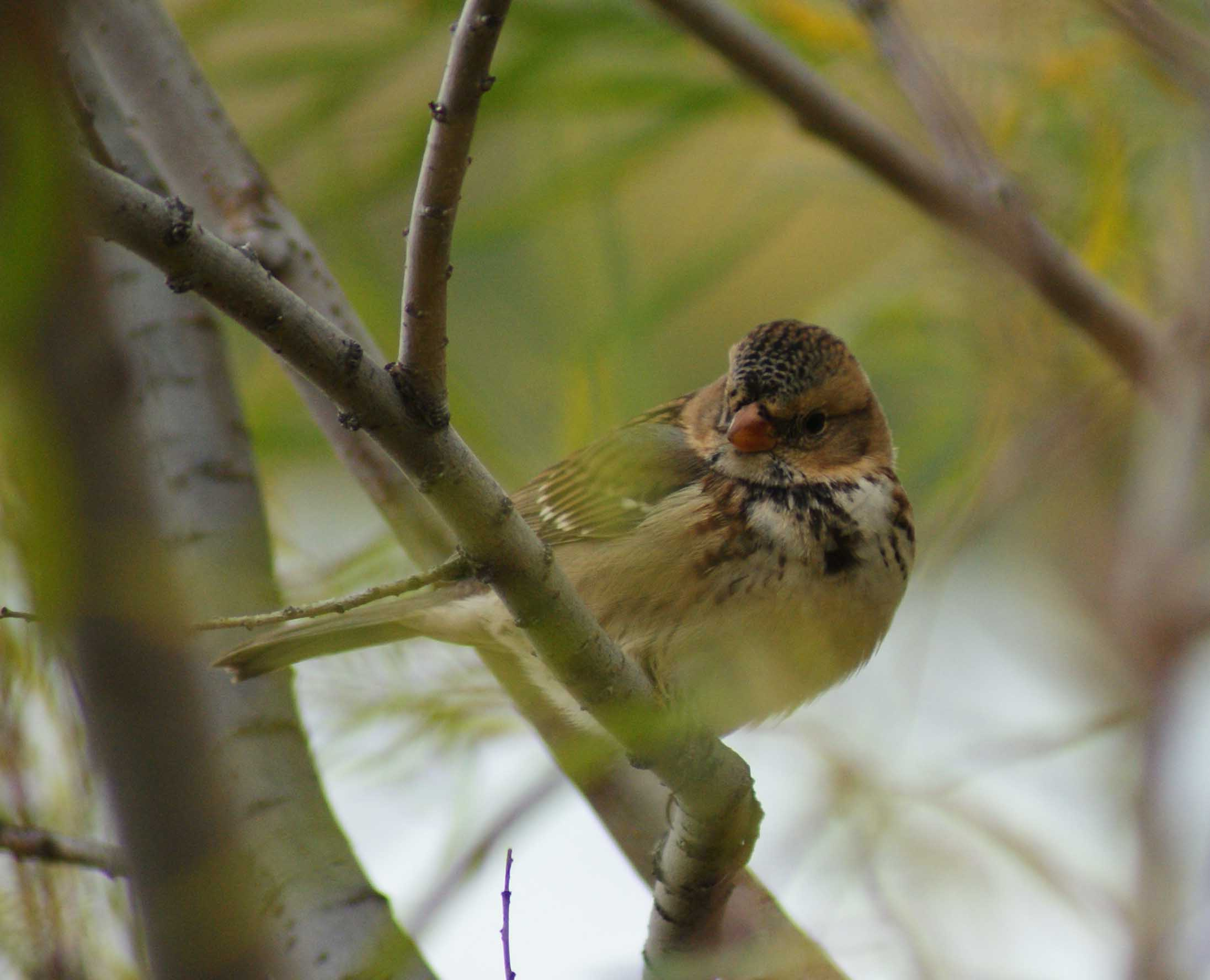
The immature Harris's sparrow has a brown striped head as opposed to the black striped head of the mature breeding bird. Note the orange bill.

Harris's sparrow (Zonotrichia querula) is a large sparrow. Their breeding habitat is the north part of central Canada (primarily the Northwest Territories and Nunavut, ranging slightly into northern Manitoba and Saskatchewan), making it Canada's only endemic breeding bird. In the winter they migrate to the Great Plains states of the United States, from southern South Dakota to central Texas. The common name of this species commemorates the American amateur ornithologist Edward Harris (1799–1863).

== Description ==
This species is the largest of the sparrows in the family Passerellidae, though other superficially dissimilar species in the family may slightly exceed them in size. They range in total length from 17 to 20 cm (6.7 to 7.9 in), with a 27 cm (11 in) wingspan and weigh from 26 to 49 g (0.92 to 1.73 oz). Among standard measurements, the wing chord is 7.7 to 9.2 cm (3.0 to 3.6 in), the tail is 7.6 to 8.8 cm (3.0 to 3.5 in), the bill is 1.1 to 1.4 cm (0.43 to 0.55 in) and the tarsus is 2.2 to 2.5 cm (0.87 to 0.98 in).

This is a very distinctive looking species. Breeding plumage birds have conspicuous pink bills and black on the crown, face, throat and upper breast, contrasting with grey on the sides of the head and neck. The back is brown, overlaid with heavy black streaking. There are two white wing bars. Breeding birds have white lower underparts with some black mottling on flanks. Non-breeding adults are more buffy than grey and brown, with reduced or absent black markings and often have whitish scalloping on the head and throat. Immatures have less black than all adult plumages, normally marked with a white chin and throat, a black malar stripe and a broad smudgy black breast-band. Juveniles have a brownish crown streaked with black and fine dark streaks and some broader black markings on the underside. Birds moult from July to September. Confusion of wintering birds is possible with the winter Lapland longspur (Calcarius lapponicus) but that species is much shorter-tailed with white outer rectrices, has rich rufous in greater coverts, and is strictly terrestrial on open ground.

The song of Harris's sparrow is usually delivered from a high perch. The song consists of a series of one or more clear high wavering whistles followed by another series in higher or lower pitch. They have also been known to call out a strong, metallic chink, as well as some variable musical twittering.

== Habitat ==
Harris's sparrow breeds in stunted coniferous forests and adjacent scrubs, especially areas of the grand boreal forests where stands of spruce abut mossy bogs. They often nest near the northern limit of tree growth in the forest-tundra ecotone. Typical plant life in the breeding grounds consist of white and black spruce (Picea glauca and P. mariana) and American larch (Larix laricina), dwarf birch-willow, and wet sedge meadow and shrubby tundra with dwarf ericad/lichen plant life. The species migrates mainly through tallgrass prairies to winter in open woodlands, woodland edges and clearings, hedgerows, dense riparian thickets and around brush piles. Harris's sparrow regularly occurs at feeders in suburban and rural gardens during the wintertime. Their winter range is generally restricted to tallgrass prairies and sparse oak-hickory forests; wintering and migrating sparrows are attracted to brush piles, low hedges, and dense riparian vegetation. They may also favor foraging in rural roadways lined with marsh elder (Iva annua) and giant ragweed (Ambrosia trifida).

== Behaviour ==
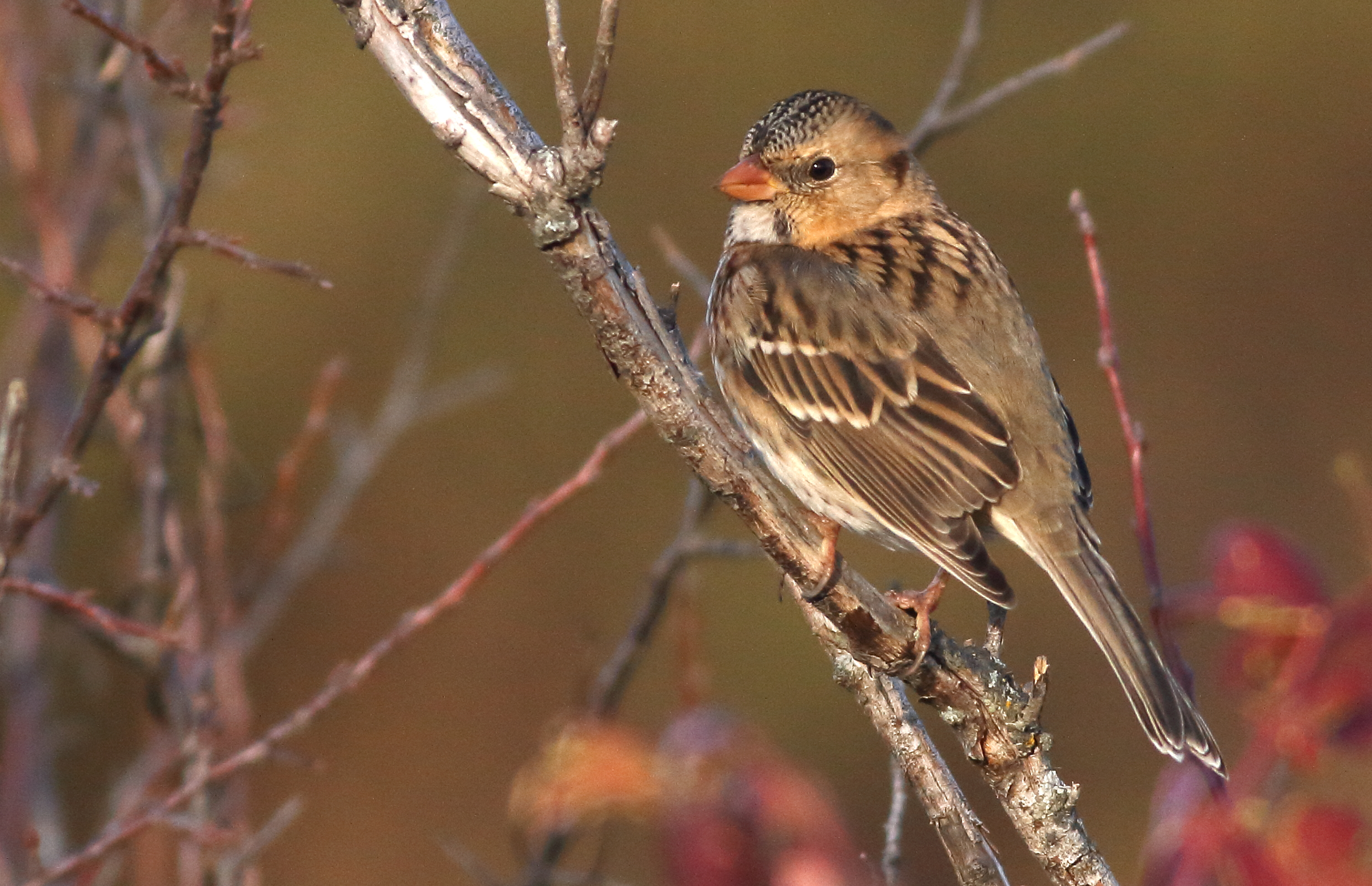
Harris's Sparrow near Denton, Nebraska. October 2017.

=== Migration ===
Spring migration commences around late February with birds arriving on breeding grounds by May. Sparrows arrive on their wintering grounds as early as late October, though mostly during November and early December. Records from Banff National Park suggest Harris's sparrows may use mountain valleys as migration routes during the autumn migration when blown off course in poor weather. Apparently, fall migration is less strict than spring migration as Harris's sparrows regularly wander about prairie provinces in Canada until harsh weather forces them south.

=== Feeding ecology ===
Harris's sparrow generally feeds on the ground, scratching vigorously in the leaves and soil for food. Observed foraging during nesting was 85% ground-gleaning. During the breeding season individuals typically forage alone or with a mate. Primary in the diet (66% of stomach contents of breeding birds) are seeds, largely of Carex sedges, grasses and Scirpus bulrush. Also important in the breeding season diet are fruits, largely black crowberry (Empetrum nigrum), mountain bearberry (Arctostaphylos alpina) and various Vaccinium species. Pine needles, flower buds and blossoms are eaten supplementally. Larval invertebrates are important from June to September in the diet, as available prey becomes more common at this point. The principal preferred animal prey includes beetles, flies, bees, ants, moths, butterflies, spiders, cicadas, aphids and leafhoppers. On its wintering range, Harris's sparrow eats primarily seeds, especially those of ragweed and Polygonum species. It will also take waste grains from agricultural fields, primarily corn but also wheat and oats. The small minority (<10%) of their winter diet which is not composed of various seeds and grains is made up of invertebrates, with up to a quarter of these being leafhoppers (Cicadellidae).

=== Sociality ===
Males of this species often group together to sing at dusk. In winter flocks, Harris's sparrows maintain linear dominance hierarchies that determine access to food and roost sites. The most dominant birds are the oldest males which usually also have the largest bibs. "Jump fights" between males occasionally occur, consisting of birds facing off, then leaping at each other, pecking, clawing and beating each other with wings. Testosterone alone does not affect the dominance status of winter birds. If first winter birds have their feathers dyed black, creating an artificially large bib, they rise in the dominance hierarchy past females and other young males. It is usually found in flocks up to several dozen in winter, individuals regularly wandering outside of the "normal" range and turning up in flocks of other sparrow species.

=== Reproduction ===
Breeding pairs establish a territory of about 2 ha (4.9 acres). Nests are usually constructed in early to mid-June. Eggs are usually laid by late June to July, depending on when snow in their habitat completely melts. In this species, nests are placed in a well-hidden spot on the ground underneath a thick bush or small conifer or in mossy depression in thick grass clumps. Both parents build a cup nest out of twigs, grass, moss and lichens and line it with fine grasses. From three to five eggs are laid, being variably greenish or greyish in colour with differing degrees of small reddish-brown spot. Eggs average 22.2 mm × 16.5 mm (0.87 in × 0.65 in) in size and weigh approximately 3.3 g (0.12 oz). The incubation stage lasts for approximately 13.5 days. The chicks weigh about 3.1 g (0.11 oz) upon hatching. The young will fledge in about 8 to 10 days, from July 4 to July 13. About 3 weeks after fledging, the young become independent of their parents. Second clutches may be laid if the first is destroyed, usually prolonging the brooding period a further three days for the parent sparrows. The species is arguably the least studied North American sparrow due to its isolated nesting territory. The first nest ever found was discovered 1931 in Churchill, Manitoba by ornithologist George M. Sutton, 91 years after the species was initially described.

== Longevity and mortality ==
The oldest known Harris's sparrow was at least 11 years and 8 months when it was recaptured at a banding station in 1983. Predators of eggs and nestlings include terrestrial mammals, primarily Arctic ground squirrels (Spermophilus parryii) but also stoats (Mustela erminea) and potentially American red squirrels (Tamasciurus hudsonicus). Nesting adults also give alarm calls upon seeing Canada jays (Perisoreus canadensis) approach the nest, indicating that these birds might be infrequent nest predators. Northern shrikes (Lanius excubitor) are the primary predator of adult Harris's sparrows on the breeding grounds, though Canada jays, parasitic jaegers (Stercorarius parasiticus), and merlins (Falco columbarius) may also occaisionally depredate adults. Potential predators of Harris's sparrow on its wintering grounds include hawks of the Accipiter and Astur genera along with domestic cats. As an anti-predator adaptation, Harris's sparrows fly up into trees when startled by other animals, usually issuing an alarm call in the process (weenk). They duck down to the ground when threatened by other birds. They also produce alarm calls when threatened to alert others.

== Conservation status ==
This species is classified as being of near threatened by the IUCN. The total breeding population is estimated at 2 million individuals. However, the species came to be included on the "Audubon Watchlist" because there appears to have been a decline in the number of birds observed in annual Christmas Bird Counts across North America. The species is fairly adaptable in wintering habitat and feeding opportunities and its habitat is isolated enough to be out of reach for heavy human development, which makes the recent declines something of a mystery. The species breeds on the northern edge of boreal forests and it is possible that habitat change in their breeding range is affecting this sparrow. The boreal forest, beyond heavy logging, has been adversely affected by increased wildfire and declining soil quality, both of which are likely correlated to global climate change.
