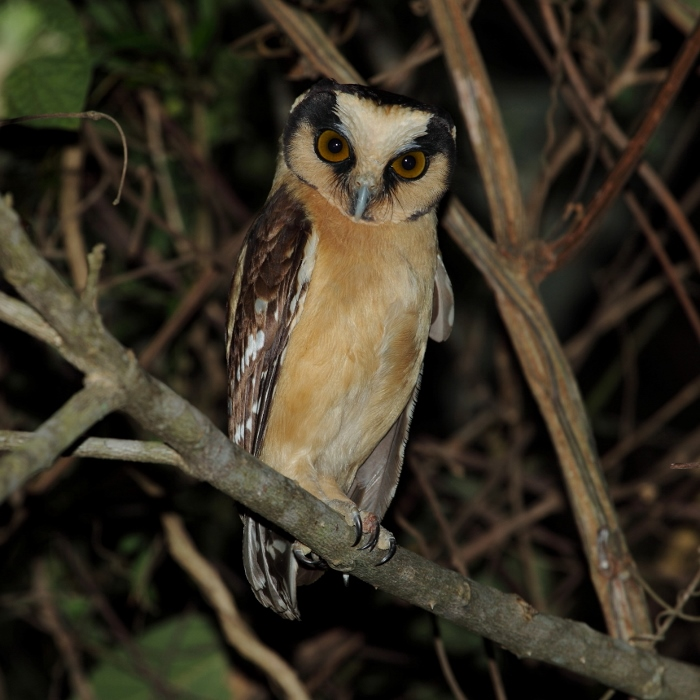
- Buff-fronted Owl at Dourado, São Paulo State, Brazil

Conservation status
- Least Concern (IUCN 3.1)
- CITES Appendix II (CITES)

Scientific classification
- Kingdom: Animalia
- Phylum: Chordata
- Class: Aves
- Order: Strigiformes
- Family: Strigidae
- Genus: Aegolius
- Species: A. harrisii

Binomial name
- Aegolius harrisii (Cassin, 1849)

= Buff-fronted owl =

Species of owl

The buff-fronted owl (Aegolius harrisii) is a small owl. It is found in widely separated areas in every South American country except French Guiana and Suriname.

== Taxonomy and systematics ==
The buff-fronted owl was described by the American ornithologist John Cassin in 1849, and given the binomial name Nyctale harrisii. The binomial commemorates the American ornithologist Edward Harris.

The buff-fronted owl is the only member of genus Aegolius in South America. Its closest relative is the northern saw-whet owl (A. acadicus) of Canada and the U.S., and the other two extant members of the genus are found there and in Mexico. It has three subspecies, the nominate A. h. harrisii, A. h. dabbenei, and A. h. iheringi. The last of these has been suggested to be a separate species.

== Description ==
The buff-fronted owl is 19 to 21 cm (7.5 to 8.3 in) long and weighs 104 to 155 g (3.7 to 5.5 oz). It is compact and has a short tail and a large blocky head without ear tufts. Its facial disks are buff with a black surround and distinctive black patches above its greenish yellow eyes. The nominate subspecies' forehead and hindneck are yellowish buff and the rest of the head and upperparts chocolate brown. The tail is blackish and has two white bars and a white tip. Its chin has a small brown patch and the rest of the underparts are yellowish buff. A. h. dabbenei has darker upperparts and a cinnamon tinge on the underparts. A. h. iheringi is also darker above and its underparts are a deeper orange.

== Distribution and habitat ==
The nominate subspecies of the buff-fronted owl is found discontinuously in the Andes from Venezuela south to southern Peru. A. h. iheringi is also found discontinuously, in Bolivia, Paraguay, eastern Brazil, and in southern Brazil, northeastern Argentina, and northeastern Paraguay. A. h. dabbenei is found in northwestern Argentina, and birds observed in western Bolivia might also be this subspecies. The subspecies of birds found locally on the tepuis of southern Venezuela and Guyana is not known.

The buff-fronted owl inhabits a variety of landscapes including open humid forest, dry forest, forest edges, subtropical rainforest, and human-altered areas with fruit trees and palms. In the Andes it ranges between 1,500 and 3,800 m (4,900 and 12,500 ft) and elsewhere between about 600 and 1,000 m (2,000 and 3,300 ft).

== Behavior ==
=== Feeding ===
The buff-fronted owl's hunting behavior and diet have not been studied. It has been recorded taking insects, rodents, birds, and other small vertebrates.

=== Breeding ===
Almost nothing is known about the buff-fronted owl's breeding phenology. A nest with three eggs was found in Brazil in March; it was in a dead palm, in what appeared to be an abandoned parrot nest cavity. Another nest was in a hollow tree.

=== Vocalization ===
The male buff-fronted owl's song is "a rapid, wavering trill, 'frurururururururu'". Dependent fledglings give a "hissing, raspy 'cheet' begging call".

== Status ==
The IUCN had originally assessed the buff-fronted owl as being Near Threatened but in 2004 downlisted it to being of Least Concern. It is generally thought to be rare but is probably overlooked. Its population is unknown and believed to be stable.
