= Peter Gustaf Tengmalm =

Swedish physician and naturalist

- Born: 29 June 1754; Stockholm
- Died: 27 August 1803 (aged 49); Västerås, Sweden
- Education: Uppsala University
- Known for: Owl classification
- Scientific career
- Fields: Medicine, ornithology, especially owls
- Institutions: Eskilstuna, Västmanland (successively medical officer in both places)

Peter Gustaf Tengmalm (29 June 1754 – 27 August 1803) was a Swedish physician and naturalist.

Tengmalm was born in Stockholm and studied medicine at Uppsala University. He spent his spare time studying birds and became an accomplished taxidermist. He graduated in 1785 and moved to the town of Eskilstuna, where he worked as the provincial medical officer. In 1792 he travelled to Scotland and England, meeting other naturalists including Joseph Banks, and returning to Stockholm in the following year.

Tengmalm then became medical officer for Västmanland. He contributed papers on both medicine and ornithology to the Royal Swedish Academy of Sciences, becoming a member in 1797. He died of dysentery, which he caught from his patients during an epidemic.

Tengmalm was interested in owls and improved upon Linnaeus' owl classification in a paper to the Academy of Sciences. Johann Friedrich Gmelin named an owl Strix tengmalmi after him in 1788 in the mistaken belief that Tengmalm had been the first to describe it. It was subsequently discovered that Linnaeus had already named the same owl earlier in 1758, as Aegolius funereus, but the common name, Tengmalm's owl, remains.
