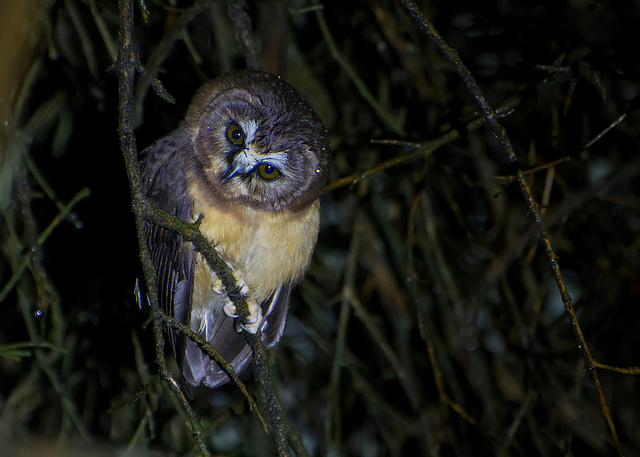

Conservation status
- Least Concern (IUCN 3.1)
- CITES Appendix II

Scientific classification
- Kingdom: Animalia
- Phylum: Chordata
- Class: Aves
- Order: Strigiformes
- Family: Strigidae
- Genus: Aegolius
- Species: A. ridgwayi

Binomial name
- Aegolius ridgwayi (Alfaro, 1905)

= Unspotted saw-whet owl =

Species of owl

The unspotted saw-whet owl (Aegolius ridgwayi) is a small "typical owl" in subfamily Surniinae. It is native to mountainous areas of Central America.

== Taxonomy and systematics ==
The unspotted saw-whet owl's taxonomy is unsettled. The International Ornithological Committee (IOC) treats it as monotypic. The Clements taxonomy and BirdLife International's Handbook of the Birds of the World (HBW) assign it three subspecies, the nominate A. r. ridgwayi, A. r. tacanensis, and A. r. rostratus. HBW's assignment is provisional. A. r. tacanensis and A. r. rostratus were each described from a single specimen. The unspotted saw-whet owl and the northern saw-whet owl (A. acadicus) form a superspecies and some authors have proposed that they are a single species.

== Description ==
The unspotted saw-whet owl is 18 to 21.5 cm (7.1 to 8.5 in) long and weighs about 80 to 90 g (2.8 to 3.2 oz). Its upperparts, throat, and upper breast are plain sepia brown and the lower breast and belly plain cinnamon buff. The tail is a darker brown and the wings generally a grayer brown. Its facial disk is brown with a narrow white border; the lores, chin, and "eyebrows" are whitish. It has yellow eyes. The two putative subspecies other than the nominate differ only slightly from it.

== Distribution and habitat ==
The nominate subspecies of unspotted saw-whet owl is found from central Costa Rica into western Panama. A. r. tacanensis is found in Mexico's Chiapas state. A. r. rostratus is found in Guatemala and northwestern El Salvador. The species inhabits humid temperate montane forest. Vegetation communities include humid oak forest, cloudforest, and pine-oak forest. It generally stays in the forest canopy but can be found in more open areas with scattered trees but close to forest edges. In elevation it ranges between 1,700 and 3,000 m (5,600 and 9,800 ft) in the northern part of its range, between 2,200 and 2,900 m (7,200 and 9,500 ft) in Costa Rica, and between 2,100 and 3,500 m (6,900 and 11,500 ft) in Panama.

== Behavior ==
The unspotted saw-whet owl is nocturnal. It is usually solitary, except in the breeding season, and is thought to be territorial. Its flight is described as "fluttery, agile, with quick wingbeats."

=== Movement ===
The unspotted saw-whet owl is resident throughout its range.

=== Feeding ===
The unspotted saw-whet owl's diet has not been detailed. Small mammals such as shrews and rodents are thought to be its primary prey. It is also thought to take birds and bats.

=== Breeding ===
The unspotted saw-whet owl's breeding phenology is not well known. Its breeding season appears to span between at least March and July. It nests in cavities, either natural or made by woodpeckers, and is thought to lay five or six eggs.

=== Vocalization ===
The male unspotted saw-whet owl's territorial call is "a whistled hoo hoo hoo…" given about 10 times over three to five seconds. Females give "a hight, slightly hissing ssirr". Both sexes give "a surprisingly loud shriek and a shrill short chipper". The call of tree frogs of genus Anotheca is extremely similar to the owl's song and easily confused with it.

== Status ==
The IUCN originally assessed the unspotted saw-whet owl as Near Threatened but since 2004 has rated it as being of Least Concern. As of 2025, its population size is estimated to be 20,000 – 50,000 mature individuals, and believed to be decreasing. Only in the highest elevations of its range is its forest habitat relatively undisturbed; at lower elevations deforestation for timber, agriculture, and pasturing is widespread. Mexican conservation authorities list it as in peril of extinction in that country.
