= Edward Harris (ornithologist) =

American farmer and amateur naturalist

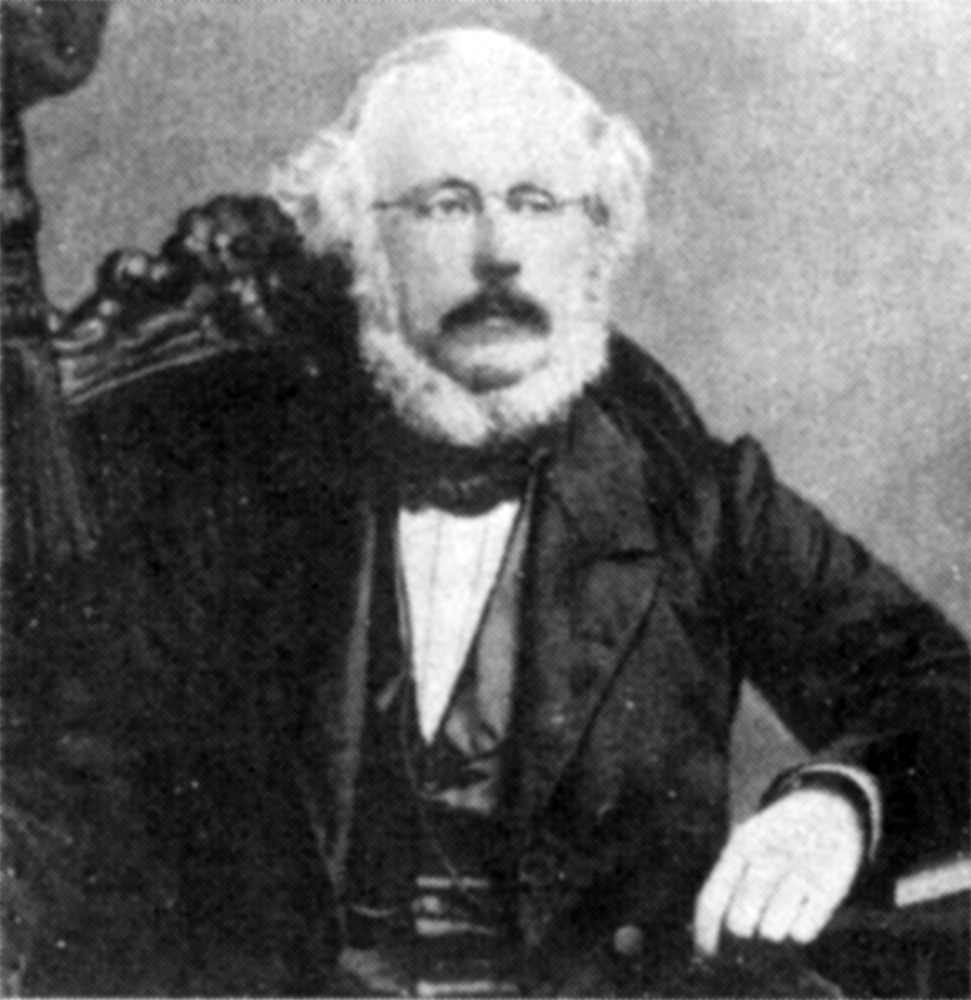
- Born: September 7, 1799; Moorestown, New Jersey, U.S.
- Died: June 8, 1863 (aged 63)
- Occupations: Farmer; Horse breeder

Edward Harris (September 7, 1799 – June 8, 1863) was an American farmer, horse breeder, philanthropist, naturalist, and ornithologist who accompanied John James Audubon on two of his expeditions to observe birds and mammals of America. Harris was commemorated by Audubon in the common names of the Harris's hawk, the Harris's sparrow, and the Harris's antelope squirrel, and by John Cassin in the binomial of the buff-fronted owl, Aegolius harrisii.

Edward Harris introduced the Percheron horse to America in 1839 and established the first Percheron breeding line in the United States.

== Life ==
In 1798, Edward Harris, Sr. purchased the Smith–Cadbury Mansion and farm, located near the center of Moorestown, New Jersey, where Edward Harris, Jr. was born the following year. After inheriting the property at his father's death in 1822, Edward Harris, Jr. lived there and farmed the land until 1849.

He met the ornithologist John James Audubon in 1824 after which the two men became close friends, Harris providing Audubon with some financial assistance for the publication of Birds of America.

Harris took part in two of Audubon's expeditions: in the spring of 1837 in the Gulf of Mexico, and in 1843 along the Missouri River.
