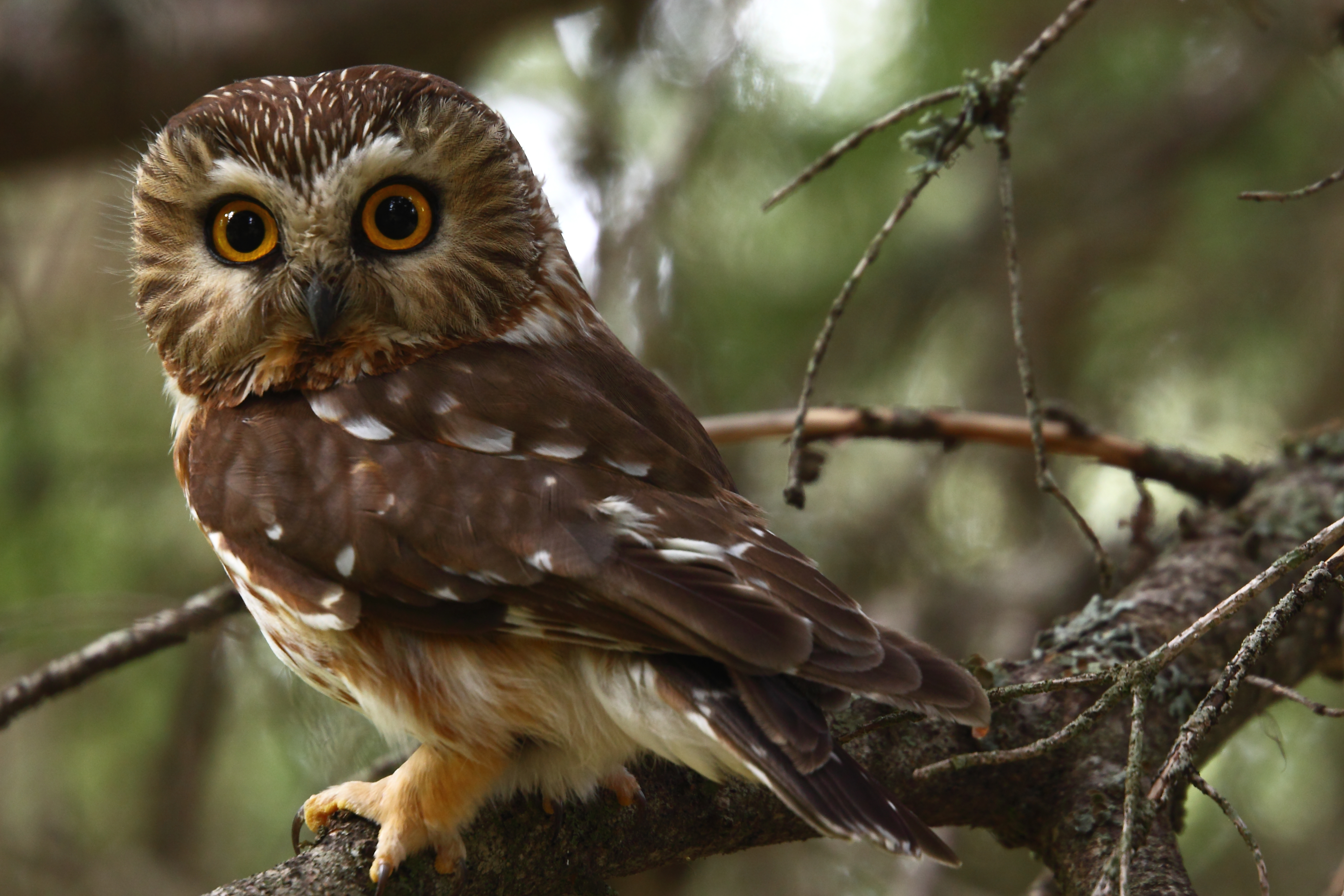

Conservation status
- Least Concern (IUCN 3.1)
- CITES Appendix II

Scientific classification
- Kingdom: Animalia
- Phylum: Chordata
- Class: Aves
- Order: Strigiformes
- Family: Strigidae
- Genus: Aegolius
- Species: A. acadicus

Binomial name
- Aegolius acadicus (Gmelin, JF, 1788)

Subspecies
- Aegolius acadicus acadicus Aegolius acadicus brooksi
- Geographical distribution of the Northern saw-whet owl. Year-round Non-breeding Non-breeding (scarce)

Synonyms
- Nyctala acadica

= Northern saw-whet owl =

Species of owl

The northern saw-whet owl (Aegolius acadicus) is a species of small owl in the family Strigidae. The species is native to North America. Saw-whet owls of the genus Aegolius are some of the smallest owl species in North America. They can be found in dense thickets, often at eye level, although they can also be found some 20 ft (6.1 m) up. Saw-whets are often in danger of being preyed upon by larger birds of prey. The northern saw-whet owl is a migratory bird without any strict pattern.

== Etymology ==
Renowned French-American ornithologist John James Audubon noted, during his early-1800s exploration of eastern North America, that Aegolius acadicus was already known in Massachusetts by the moniker saw-whet—likening this little owl's vocalizations to the rhythmic rasp of sharpening a saw on a whetting stone, a sound which was widely familiar and easily recognizable among most Americans of that era.

The genus name is Latin for a screech owl, the word came from the Ancient Greek aigōlios meaning "a bird of ill omen". The specific epithet acadicus is from "Acadia", the name of a former French colony in Nova Scotia.

== Taxonomy ==
The northern saw-whet owl was formally described in 1788 by the German naturalist Johann Friedrich Gmelin in his revised and expanded edition of Carl Linnaeus's Systema Naturae. He placed it with the other owls in the genus Strix and coined the binomial name Strix acadicus. Gmelin based his description on the "Acadian owl" from Nova Scotia that had been described and illustrated in 1781 by the English ornithologist John Latham in his multi-volume work A General Synopsis of Birds. The northern saw-whet owl is now one of five species placed in the genus Aegolius that was introduced in 1829 by the German naturalist Johann Jakob Kaup.

The scientific description of one of the subspecies of this owl is attributed to the Rev. John Henry Keen, a missionary in Canada in 1896.

=== Subspecies ===
Two subspecies are recognised:

- A. a. acadicus (Gmelin, JF, 1788) – south Alaska, Canada, north, southwest US and north Mexico
- A. a. brooksi (Fleming, JH, 1916) – Haida Gwaii (formerly the Queen Charlotte Islands) (off British Columbia, Canada)

Aegolius acadicus acadicus is found all around North America while the non-migratory Aegolius acadicus brooksi is endemic to the Haida Gwaii archipelago in British Columbia. A. a. brooksi is identified by a darker, buffier plumage and has been proposed as a separate species, the Haida Gwaii saw-whet owl. Isolated populations of northern saw-whet owls in the Allegheny Plateau and Southern Appalachian Mountains have been found to be morphologically different to mid-range owls and as genetically distinct as the subspecies A. a. brooksi in British Columbia.

== Distribution and habitat ==
The bird's habitat is coniferous forests, sometimes mixed or deciduous woods, across North America. Most birds nest in dense coniferous forests near wetlands during the breeding season, but may also breed in mixed-deciduous forests at the southern edge of their range in the eastern United States. Wintering birds prefer conifer stands or shrub thickets near water, but may occasionally be found in mixed-deciduous forest. They are secondary cavity nesters, meaning they do not make their own nest cavities but rather rely on naturally occurring holes or cavities excavated by other animals. Some are permanent residents, while others may migrate south in winter or move down from higher elevations. Their range covers most of North America south of the boreal forest, including southeastern and southcentral Alaska, southern Canada, most of the United States and the central mountains in Mexico.

Some have begun to move more southeast in Indiana and neighboring states. Buidin et al. did a study of how far north the northern saw-whet owls breed and they found that they can breed northward of 50° N, farther than ever recorded before. Their range is quite extensive and they can even breed in the far north where most birds migrate from to breed. They are an adaptive species that can do well in the cold.

There are two semi-isolated permanent populations in the eastern part of the United States. This first is a population along the West Virginia border in the Allegheny Plateau. The second population is in the higher elevations (over 4,000 ft or 1,200 m) of the southern Appalachian Mountains of western North Carolina, eastern Tennessee, and southwestern Virginia. Although there are abundant populations in the Northern and Western Regions of North America, in some counties of North Carolina, it is currently listed as a threatened species due to a decline in suitable habitat. This is due to loss of boreal forests from hemlock woolly adelgid, logging, and pollution.

== Description ==
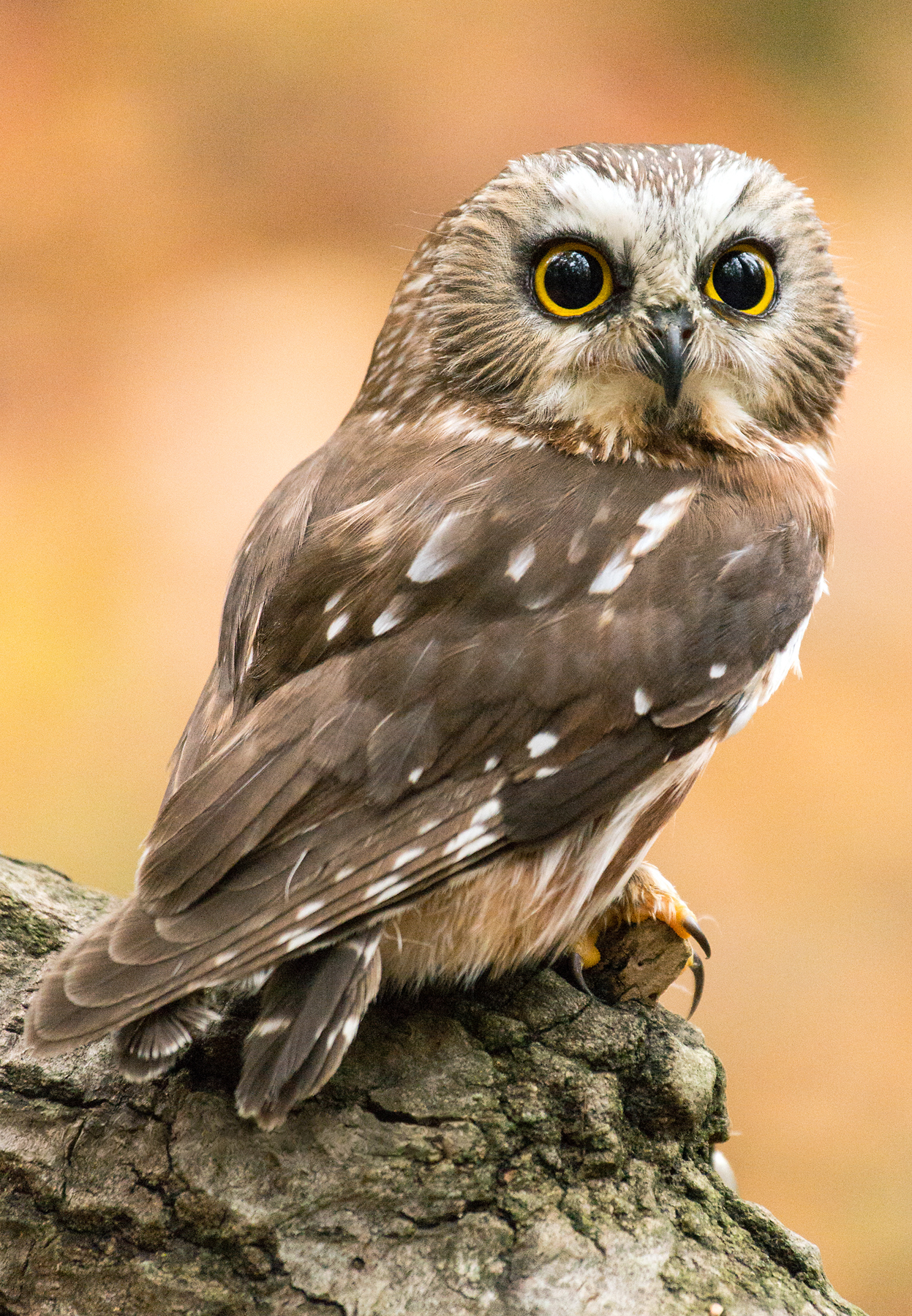
Northern saw-whet owl in Ontario, Canada

Adults are 17–22 cm (6.7–8.7 in) long with a 42–56.3 cm (16.5–22.2 in) wingspan. They can weigh from 54 to 151 g (1.9 to 5.3 oz) with an average of around 80 g (2.8 oz), making them one of the smallest owls in North America. They are similar in size to the American robin (78.5 g). Northern saw-whet owls do not exhibit sexual dimorphism in their plumage, so are often sexed by size dimorphism—females are larger than males. Females on average weigh 100 g and males on average weigh 75 g. Northern saw-whet owls have porphyrin pigments in their flight feathers. When exposed to a UV light, feathers on the ventral side of the wing fluoresce a neon pink. This is used in order to estimate molt and age in adults.

The northern saw-whet owl has a round, light, white face with brown and cream streaks; they also have a dark beak and yellow eyes. The underparts are pale with dark shaded areas; the upper parts are brown or reddish with white spots. Juveniles have a dark brown head and wings, and a tawny rust-colored breast and belly. There is also a distinct white, Y-shaped coloration between their eyes. Saw-whet owls can be confused with boreal owls, but are distinguishable by their larger size, bill color, and lack of a spotted forehead.

CornellLab's All About Birds entry says these small owls are "common and widespread", but their secretive lifestyle makes them hard to spot and makes population trends difficult to track. Partners in Flight estimates a global breeding population of 2 million and rate them 8 out of 20 on the Continental Concern Score, indicating a species of low conservation concern. However, their general population has probably declined in past decades due to habitat loss, and they are doing even worse locally in places like North Carolina, South Dakota, and in the Queen Charlotte Islands of British Columbia which are home to an endemic subspecies. Saw-whets take readily to nest boxes, which can be used to mitigate the loss of natural sites.

=== Vocalisation ===
The northern saw-whet owl makes a repeated tooting whistle sound. Some say they sound like a saw being sharpened on a whetstone. These calls are usually produced by males searching for mates, so they can be heard more often beginning in January and continuing through the end of the breeding season in early July. Despite being more common in spring, they do vocalize year round. The advertising too-too-too call has been heard up to 300 meters (980 ft) away through forest. At least 11 different vocalizations have been reported for the northern saw-whet owl. These include the advertising call, the rapid call, whine, ksew call, tssst call, squeaks, twittering call (similar to an American woodcock), guttural chuck, and begging calls of nestlings. Two additional calls only recorded in brooksi include the Transition Call and Alternate Whine. Non-vocal sounds such as bill snapping are used as a warning call by adults, juveniles and nestlings usually when approached up close or when in the hand.

== Behavior and ecology ==
=== Breeding ===
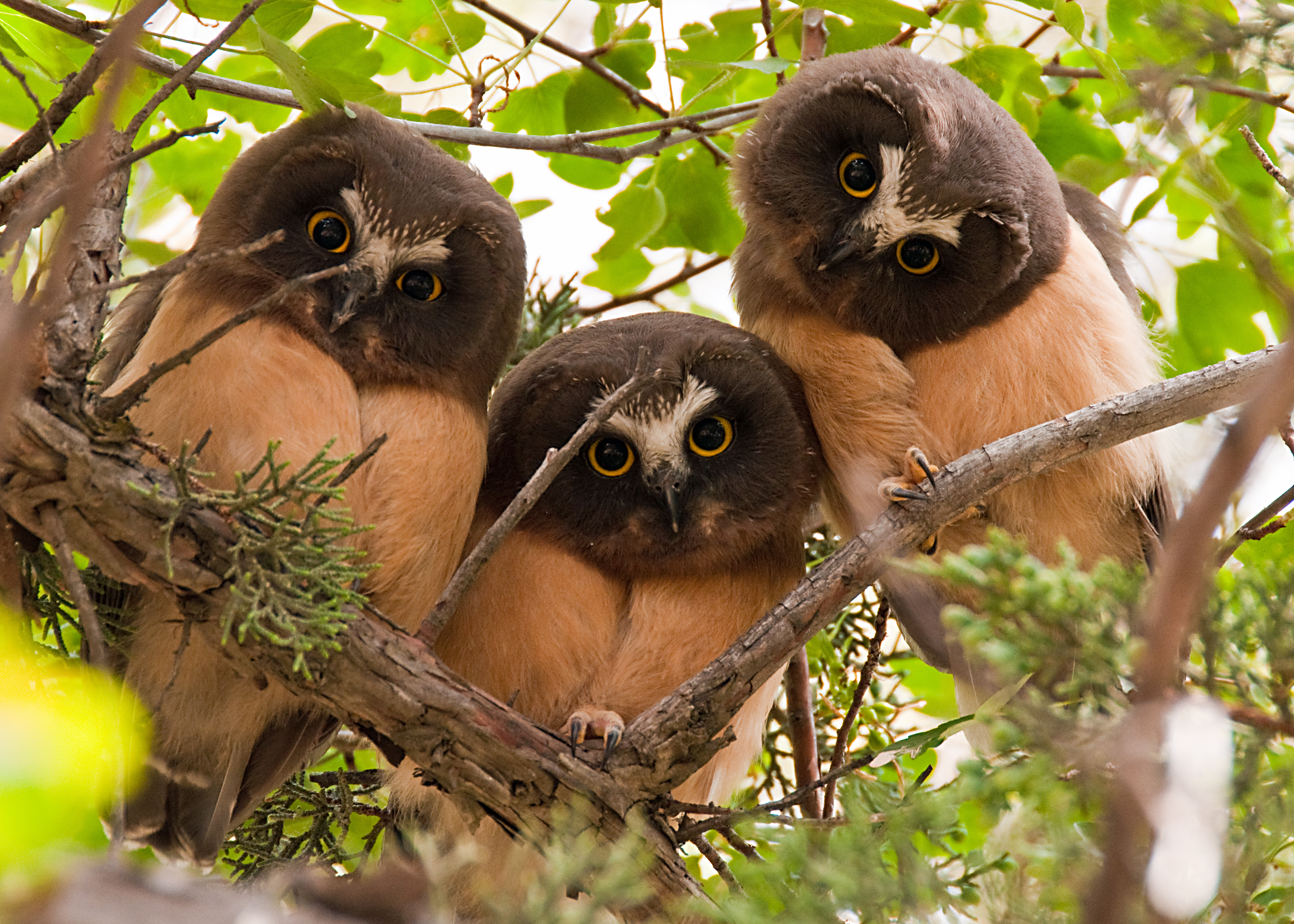
Three juveniles in Oregon, United States

Northern saw-whet owls lay about four or six white-colored eggs in natural tree cavities or woodpecker holes. Males will often sing from a nest site and cache food in nest sites in order to attract a female. The father does the hunting while the mother watches and sits on her eggs. Females can have more than one clutch of eggs each breeding season with different males. Once the offspring in the first nest have developed their feathers the mother will leave the father to care for them and go find another male to reproduce with. This type of mating is sequential polyandry. They compete with boreal owls, starlings and squirrels for nest cavities and their nests may be destroyed or the nestlings eaten by those creatures as well as nest predators such as martens and corvids. Saw-whet owls of all ages may be preyed upon by any larger species of hawks or owls, of which there are at least a dozen that overlap in range including Accipiter hawks, which share with the saw-whet owls a preference for wooded habitats with dense thickets or brush.

In 2014 nesting northern saw-whet owls were found in breeding nest boxes in the Southern Appalachian mountains. This is the most southeastern known breeding area in the United States.

=== Food and feeding ===
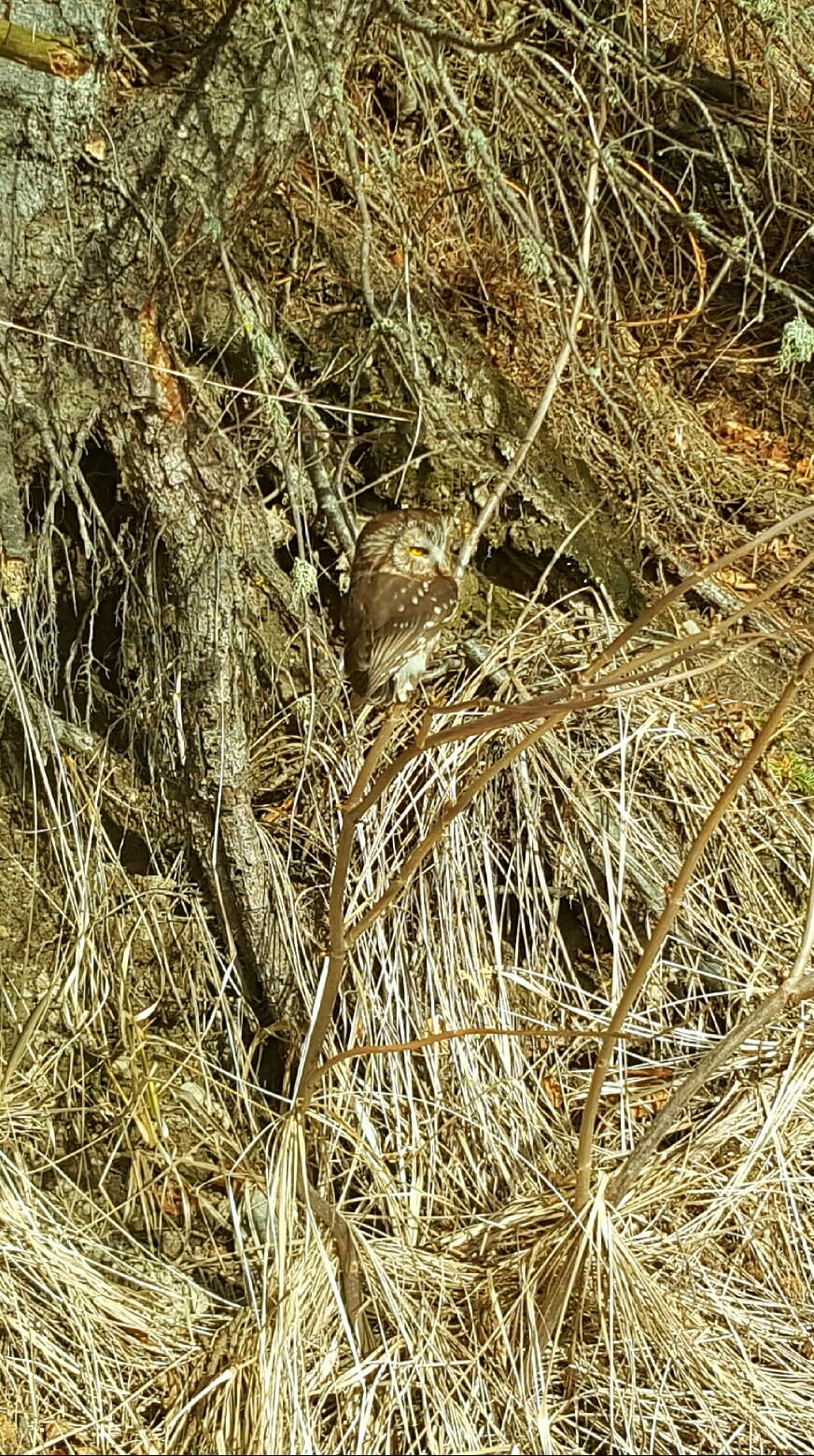
On a daytime hunt in a brushy area, Homer, Alaska

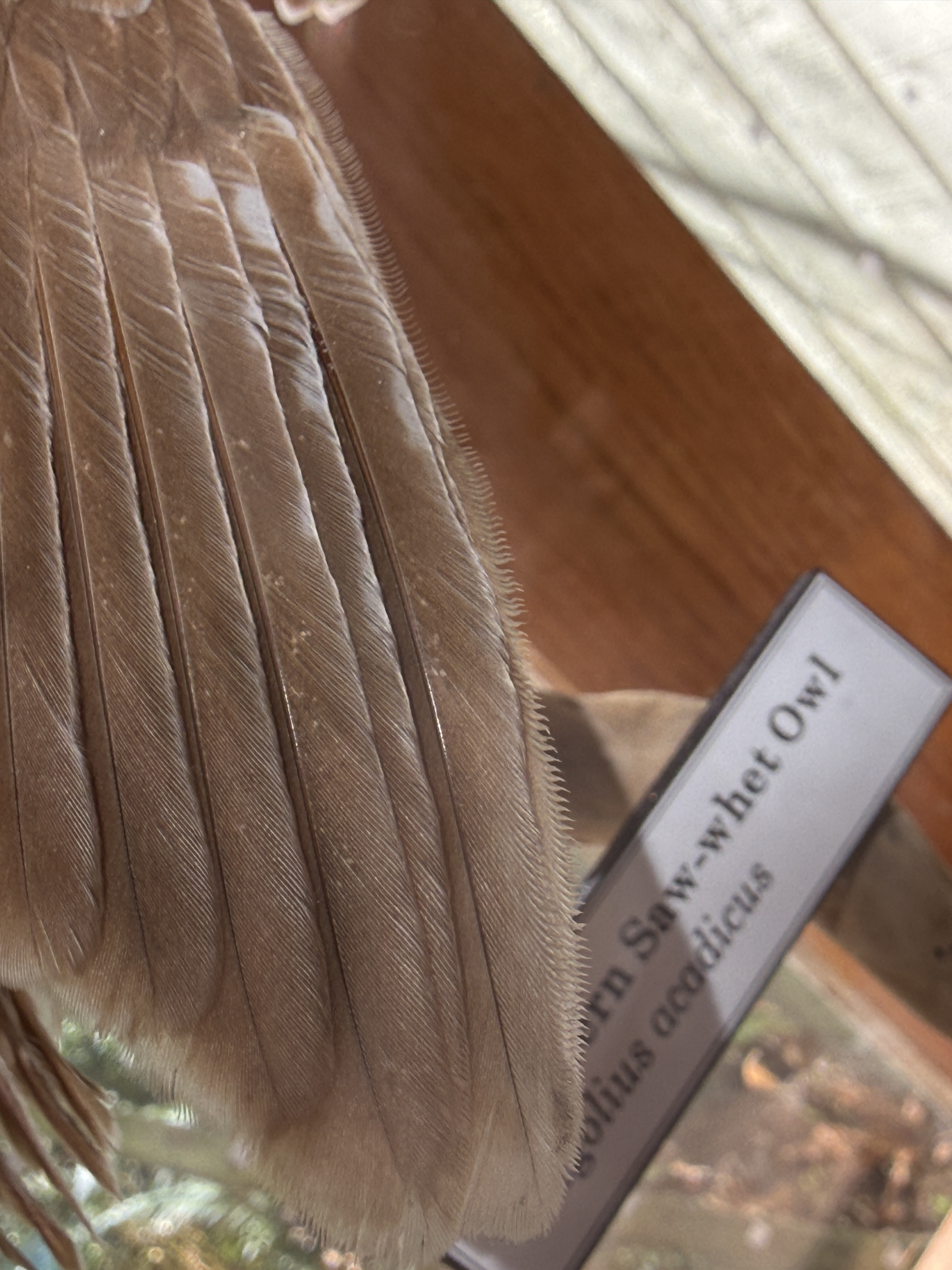
Like many owl species, the remiges have serrated leading edges, which contribute to silent flight

The northern saw-whet owl has vertically asymmetrical ears and different shapes of the ear openings. Because the sound reaches the ears at a different time and is of different intensity, the northern saw-whet owl can very precisely localize its prey. Such accurate sound localization allows it to hunt in complete darkness by hearing alone. A study by Beatini et al showed that the northern saw-whet owl had a possible frequency sensitivity of 0.7 to 8.6 kHz with the best sensitivity ranging from 1.6 to 7.1 kHz. This allows it to hunt in the dark purely by sound. The birds wait on a high perch at night and swoop down on prey. They mainly eat small organisms with a strong focus on small mammals in their diet. Swengel and Swengel (1992) reviewed ten studies that found northern saw-whet owls eating almost exclusively mammals (88% to 100%), with most of the mammals being rodents (85% to 99+%). Specifically in their Wisconsin study, the Swengels counted saw-whet owls as most often eating deer mice (Peromyscus; ~68% of captured prey), voles (Microtis pennsylvunicus and M. ochrogaster; ~16%), and shrews (~9%; Blarina brevicauda and Sorex cinereus). A similar study by Holt and Leroux (1996) in Montana found saw-whet owls eating more voles (60%) than other mammal species. Engel et al. (2015) also found in the saw-whet owl a strong preference for small mammals (89%), with 55% of prey being two species of voles.

Holt and Leroux compared the eating habits of northern saw-whet owls to northern pygmy owls and found that they prey on different animals for their main food source, with the saw-whet owl's diet 98% small mammals, while for pygmy owls over one-third of their prey was birds. Their study concluded that these owls could adapt depending on the prey and also with the other predators in the areas where they live. Engel et al. (2015) in Chain O'Lakes State Park, Illinois, during the winter of 1987–88, compared northern saw-whet owls to long-eared owls. Engel confirmed the saw-whet owl's strong preference for small mammals. Their diet appeared varied in the winter, and was less tied to one mammal than was the long-eared owl; at times, northern saw-whet owls hunted larger prey, such as the meadow vole (M. pennsylvanicus).

Other mammals preyed on occasionally include shrews, squirrels (largely chipmunks and red squirrels), various other mice species, flying squirrels, moles and bats. Also supplementing the diet are small birds, with passerines such as swallows, sparrows, kinglets and chickadees favored. However, larger birds, up to the size of rock dove (which are typically about 4 times as heavy as a saw-whet owl) can even be taken. On the Pacific coast they may also eat crustaceans, frogs and aquatic insects. Like many owls, these birds have excellent hearing and exceptional vision in low light.

== Popular culture ==
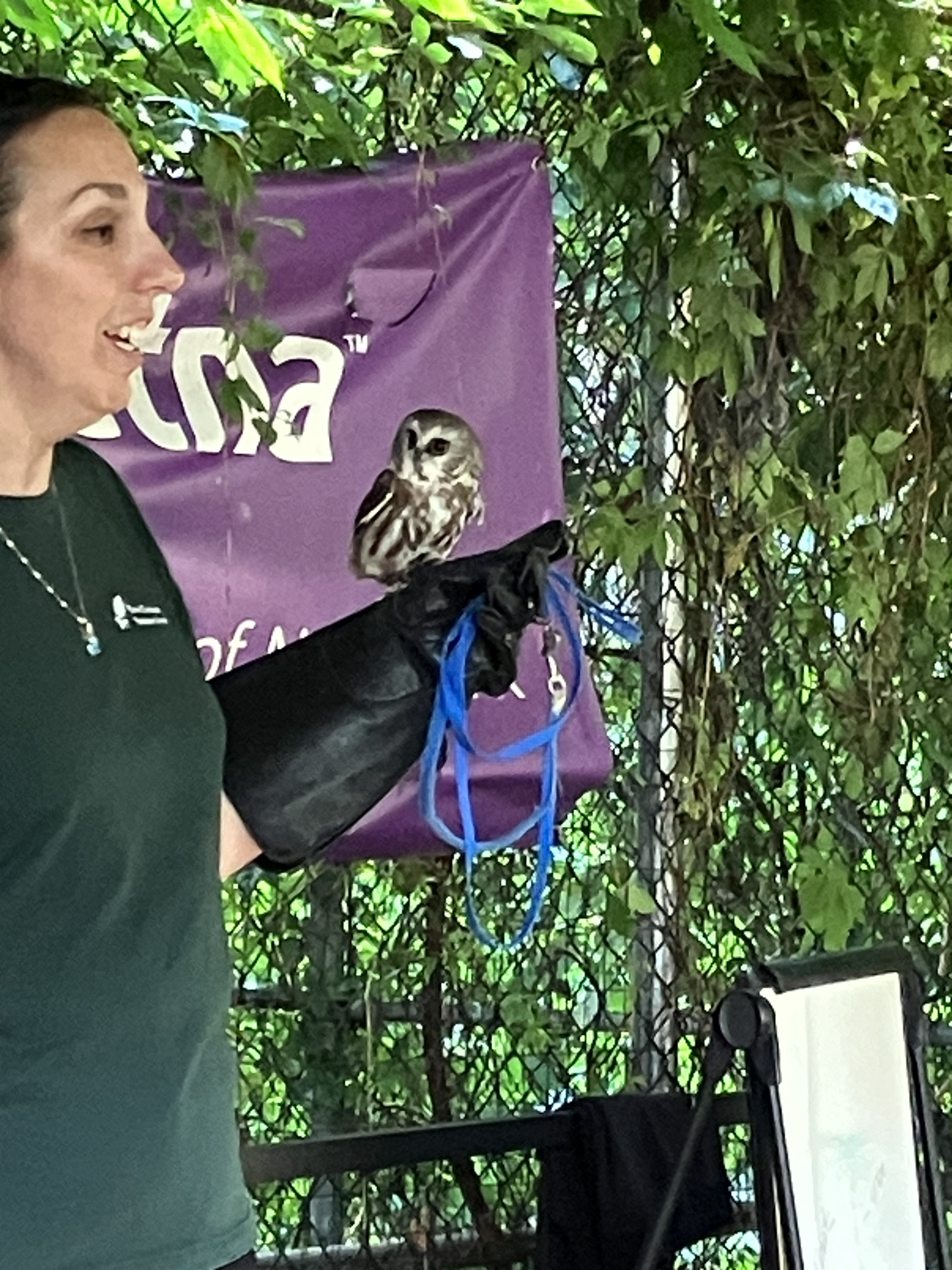
Gus, a saw-whet owl, shown at a summer program In Harlem, New York City, 2023

An adult female northern saw-whet owl was found dehydrated and hungry within the wrapped branches of the Rockefeller Center Christmas Tree during its installation on November 16, 2020. The bird was discovered by workers who transported the spruce 170 miles (274 km) from Oneonta, New York, to New York City. The feathered stowaway, named Rockefeller (Rocky), endured the three-day road trip and generated much public interest and media coverage. She was taken to a wildlife center for a check-up and nursed to full strength before being released on the grounds of the wildlife center in Saugerties, New York. Rocky gained more fame when Frontier Airlines announced that her image will be featured on the aircraft tails in their fleet.
