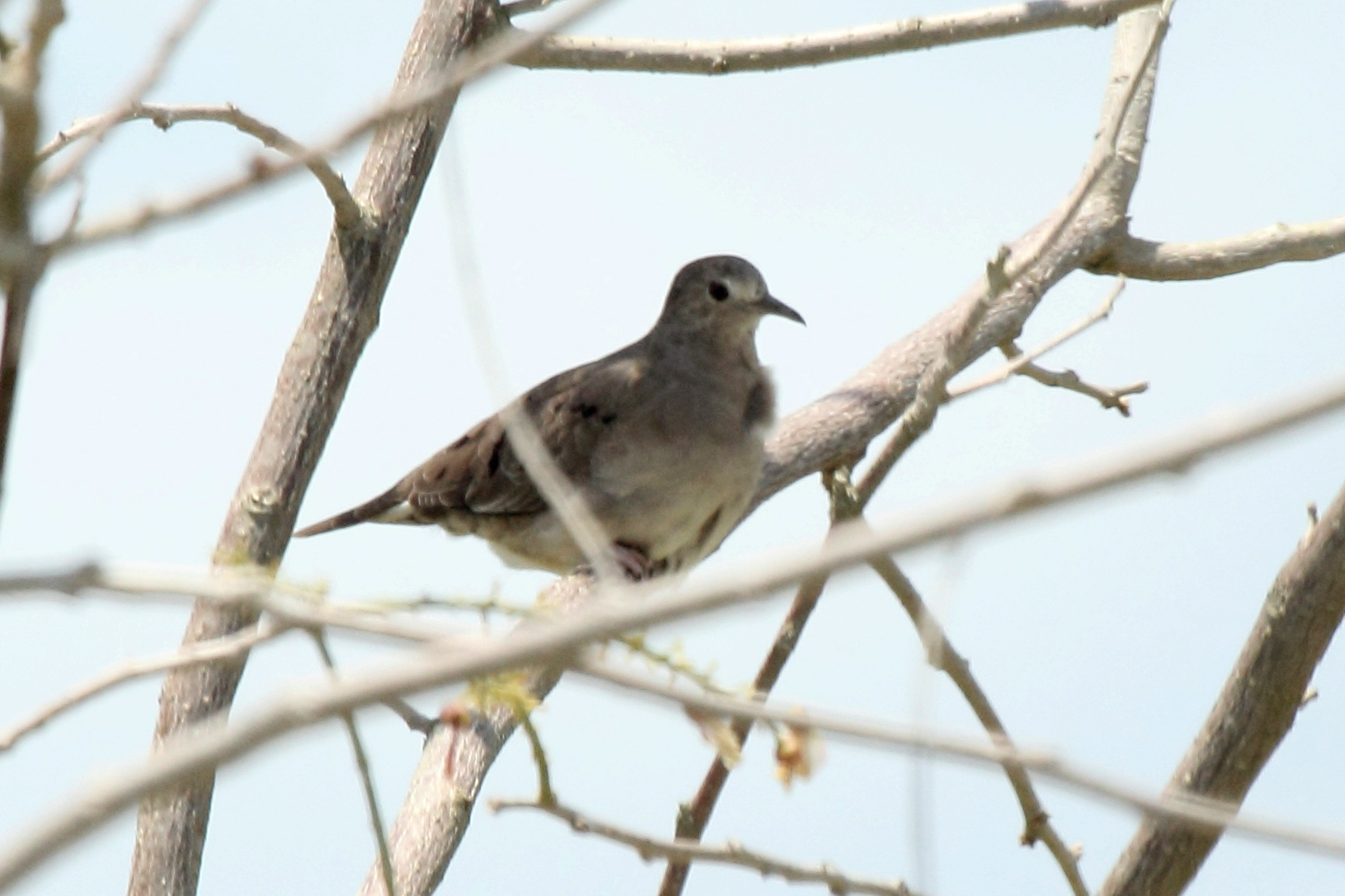

Conservation status
- Least Concern (IUCN 3.1)

Scientific classification
- Kingdom: Animalia
- Phylum: Chordata
- Class: Aves
- Order: Columbiformes
- Family: Columbidae
- Genus: Columbina
- Species: C. minuta

Binomial name
- Columbina minuta (Linnaeus, 1766)

Synonyms
- Columba minuta Linnaeus, 1766

= Plain-breasted ground dove =

Species of bird

The plain-breasted ground dove (Columbina minuta) is a species of bird in the family Columbidae. It lacks the scaled appearance to the feathers of the similar and typically more abundant common ground dove.

== Taxonomy ==
In 1760 the French zoologist Mathurin Jacques Brisson included a description of the plain-breasted ground dove in his six volume Ornithologie based on a specimen that he mistakenly believed had been collected in Santo Domingo of the Dominican Republic. He used the French name La petite tourterelle brune d'Amérique and the Latin Turtur parvus fuscus americanus. Although Brisson coined Latin names, these do not conform to the binomial system and are not recognised by the International Commission on Zoological Nomenclature. When in 1766 the Swedish naturalist Carl Linnaeus updated his Systema Naturae for the twelfth edition, he added 240 species that had been previously described by Brisson. One of these was the plain-breasted ground dove which he placed with the other pigeons in the genus Columba. Linnaeus included a brief description, coined the binomial name Columba minuta and cited Brisson's work. The specific name minuta is from the Latin minutus meaning "small". The type locality was subsequently corrected to Cayenne in French Guiana. The plain-breasted ground dove is now placed in the genus Columbina that was introduced by the German naturalist Johann Baptist von Spix in 1825.

Four subspecies are recognised:

- C. m. interrupta (Griscom, 1929) – south Mexico to Belize, Guatemala, and Nicaragua
- C. m. elaeodes (Todd, 1913) – Costa Rica to west central Colombia
- C. m. minuta (Linnaeus, 1766) – east Colombia and Venezuela through the Guianas to south Brazil and northeast Argentina
- C. m. amazilia (Bonaparte, 1855) – southwest Ecuador, northwest Peru

== Description ==
With a total length of approximately 14.5–16 cm (5.5–6.5 in) and a weight of 24–42 g (0.85–1.48 oz), this species averages slightly smaller than the common ground dove. The plain-breasted ground dove may be the smallest of the columbids by mass, though the more heavily built but almost tailless dwarf fruit dove of Southeast Asia is typically shorter in overall length.

The plain-breasted ground dove has dark grey to brown plumage, with somewhat paler wings with dark violet spots; the underwings are mostly rufous. It has a grey bill, pink legs, and reddish eyes. There are subtle differences between the sexes. This species may be confused with Columbina talpacoti and C. passerina, but the ruddy ground dove tends to be duller with less of a red tint, while the common ground dove has a speckled head and neck.

== Distribution and habitat ==
It is a widespread species, ranging over an area of 18,800,000 square kilometres (7,300,000 sq mi), but has a discontinuous range and does not migrate. C. minuta is found in northeastern Argentina, Belize, Bolivia, Brazil, Colombia, Costa Rica, Ecuador, El Salvador, French Guiana, Guatemala, Guyana, Honduras, Mexico, Nicaragua, Panama, Paraguay, Peru, Suriname, Trinidad and Tobago, and Venezuela. It seems to prefer an arid climate; its natural habitats are dry savanna, subtropical or tropical dry shrubland, subtropical or tropical high-altitude shrubland, subtropical or tropical seasonally wet or flooded lowland grassland, and heavily degraded former forest. It is more commonly found in lowlands, but ranges to foothills and uncommonly up to 2,100 metres (6,900 ft) above sea level.

== Ecology ==
The plain-breasted ground dove is diurnal, peaking in activity around the mid-mornings and afternoon. It forages for grain and fruits in open areas, such as grasslands. Food is processed in the gizzard with the aid of stones. As with other columbids, this species drinks through suction, which is atypical of birds which usually collect water in their oral cavity and then raise their heads to use gravity in order to drink.

C. minuta is monogamous and guard their nesting sites. Their generation length is around 2.6 years. The male displays by tilting his head while calling with an inflated crop, which visibly expands his neck and chest regions. This species is a ground nester, although they may also nest in trees in which case the nest is smaller. The eggs, around 21.5 mm in length and 16.3 mm wide, are white and are laid in clutches of one to two. The parents take turns in caring for the eggs and young; the male during the day and the female at night. The young are fed with crop milk during the first few days, and continue to be fed by the parents for some time after they've fledged.
