= C. buckleyi =

C. buckleyi may refer to:

- Centrolene buckleyi
- Columbina buckleyi
