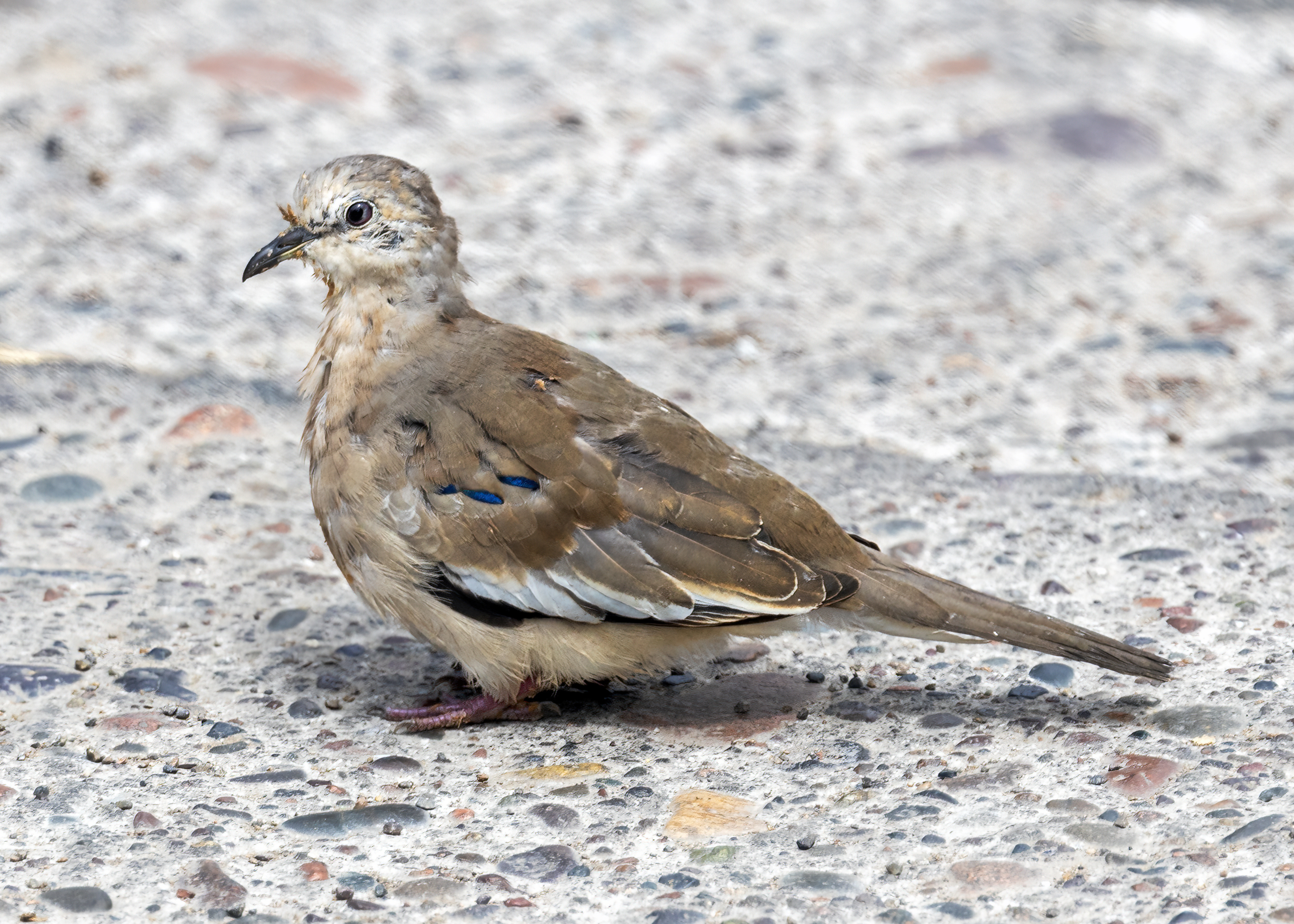

Conservation status
- Least Concern (IUCN 3.1)

Scientific classification
- Kingdom: Animalia
- Phylum: Chordata
- Class: Aves
- Order: Columbiformes
- Family: Columbidae
- Genus: Columbina
- Species: C. picui

Binomial name
- Columbina picui (Temminck, 1813)

= Picui ground dove =

Species of bird

The Picui ground dove or Picui dove (Columbina picui) is a species of bird in the family Columbidae. It is found in Argentina, Bolivia, Brazil, Chile, Colombia, Paraguay, Peru, and Uruguay.

== Taxonomy and systematics ==
The Picui ground dove and croaking ground dove (Columbina cruziana) are sometimes considered sister species. The Picui ground dove has two subspecies, the nominate C. p. picui and C. p. strepitans.

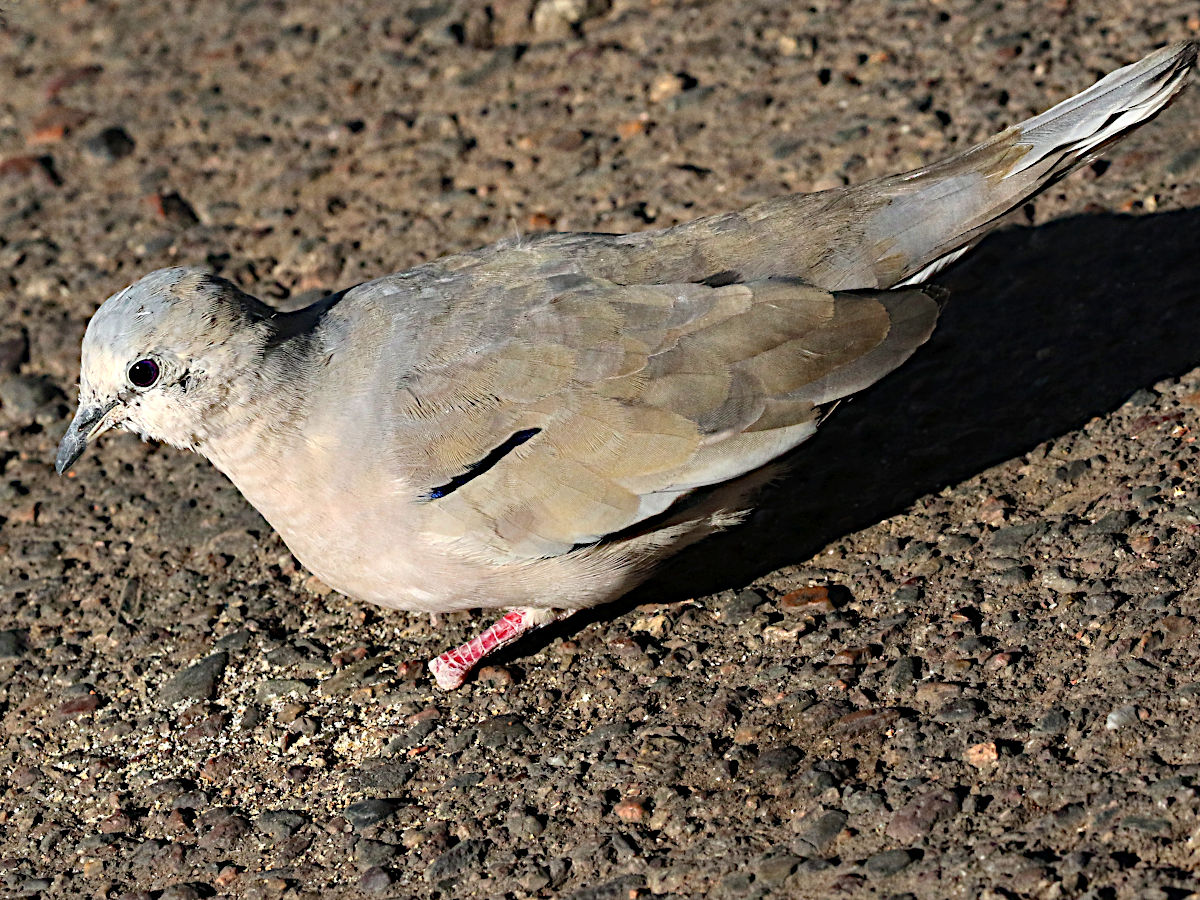
In Mendoza, Argentina

== Description ==
The Picui ground dove is 18 cm (7.1 in) long and weighs 42 to 59 g (1.5 to 2.1 oz). The nominate adult male's forehead and throat are whitish with a narrow black stripe in front of the eye. Its crown and nape are gray that becomes brownish gray on the shoulders, back, rump, and central tail feathers. The folded wing appears pinkish fawn with two white bands bordered by black. The neck and breast are pinkish gray and the belly white. The adult female is duller with less pink. These differences are faint to the human eye, but there are significant differences in ultraviolet reflectance, to which birds are believed sensitive. The juvenile is duller and browner than the adults. The upperparts and wing of C. p. strepitans are grayer than the nominate's, with less pink.

== Distribution and habitat ==
The nominate subspecies of Picui ground dove is widely distributed east of the Andes in eastern and southern Bolivia, Paraguay, and southern Brazil south through Uruguay and most of Argentina, and also west of the Andes in central Chile. It winters north to eastern Peru. C. p. strepitans has a smaller range in several states of northeastern Brazil.

The Picui ground dove mostly inhabits arid landscapes such as forest edge and savanna with its scattered trees and other cover, mesquite scrub forest, suburbs, gardens, and cultivated lands. In northwestern Argentina it ranges as high as 3,000 m (9,800 ft) and in Bolivia up to 3,700 m (12,100 ft). In most of the rest of its range it is seldom found above 1,250 m (4,100 ft).

== Behavior ==
=== Feeding ===
The Picui ground dove forages on the ground for seeds including cultivated grains, typically in groups of 25 to 30. It has been noted in the hundreds in hemp fields.

=== Breeding ===
The Picui ground dove's nesting season in Argentina spans from October to April. It makes a nest of twigs lined with finer materials in a shrub or tree and occasionally on roofs. Both members of a pair incubate the two eggs, and it is thought to double brood.

=== Vocalization ===
The Picui ground dove's song is "a series of evenly-spaced, low-pitched cooing notes...cuWOOo...cuWOOo...cuWOOo...".

== Status ==
The IUCN has assessed the Picui ground dove as being of Least Concern. The species appears to be abundant in much of its range and is rarely hunted.
