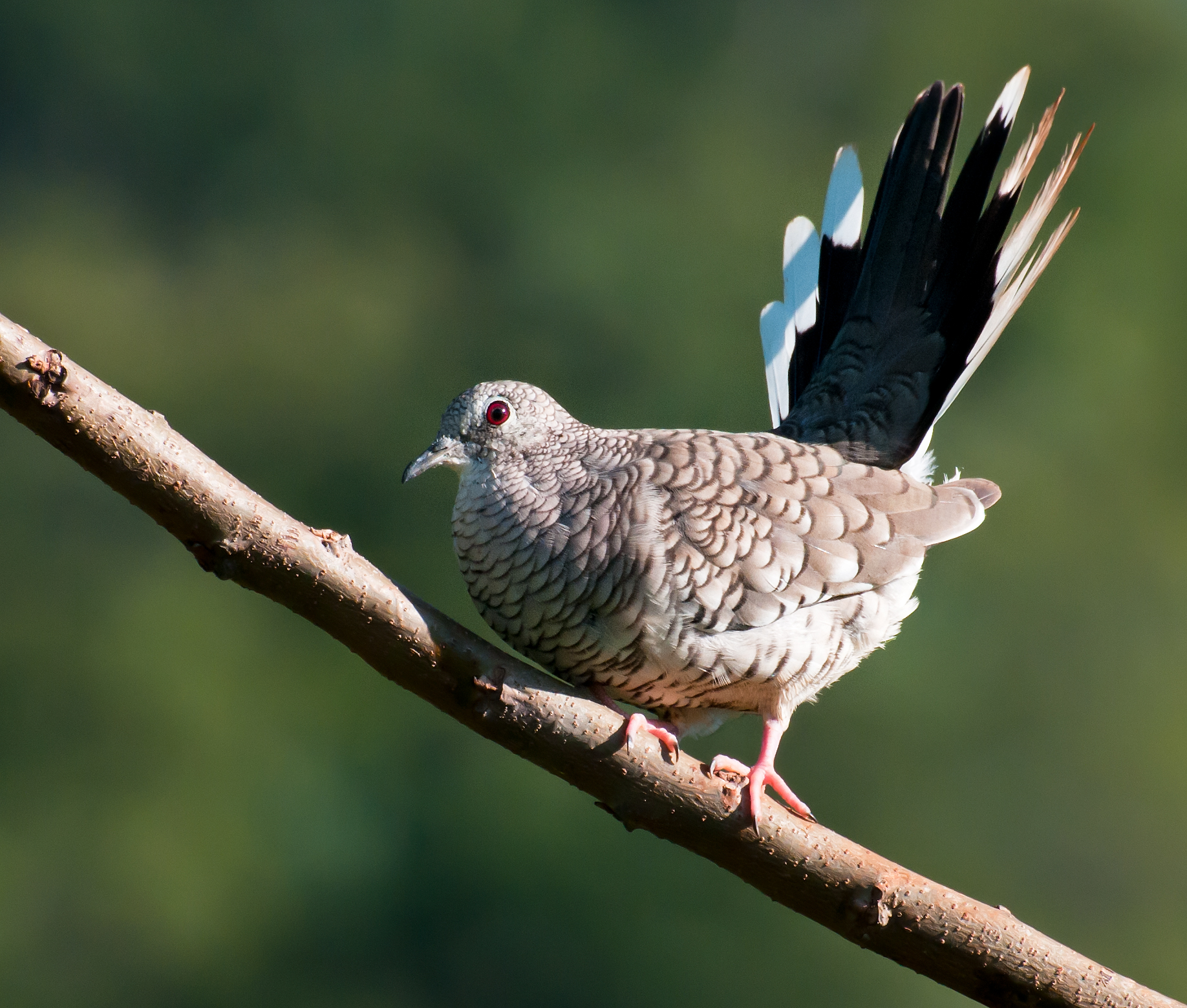
- In Bonito, Mato Grosso do Sul, Brazil

Conservation status
- Least Concern (IUCN 3.1)

Scientific classification
- Kingdom: Animalia
- Phylum: Chordata
- Class: Aves
- Order: Columbiformes
- Family: Columbidae
- Genus: Columbina
- Species: C. squammata

Binomial name
- Columbina squammata (Lesson, 1831)

Synonyms
- Scardafella squammata (but see text)

= Scaled dove =

Species of bird

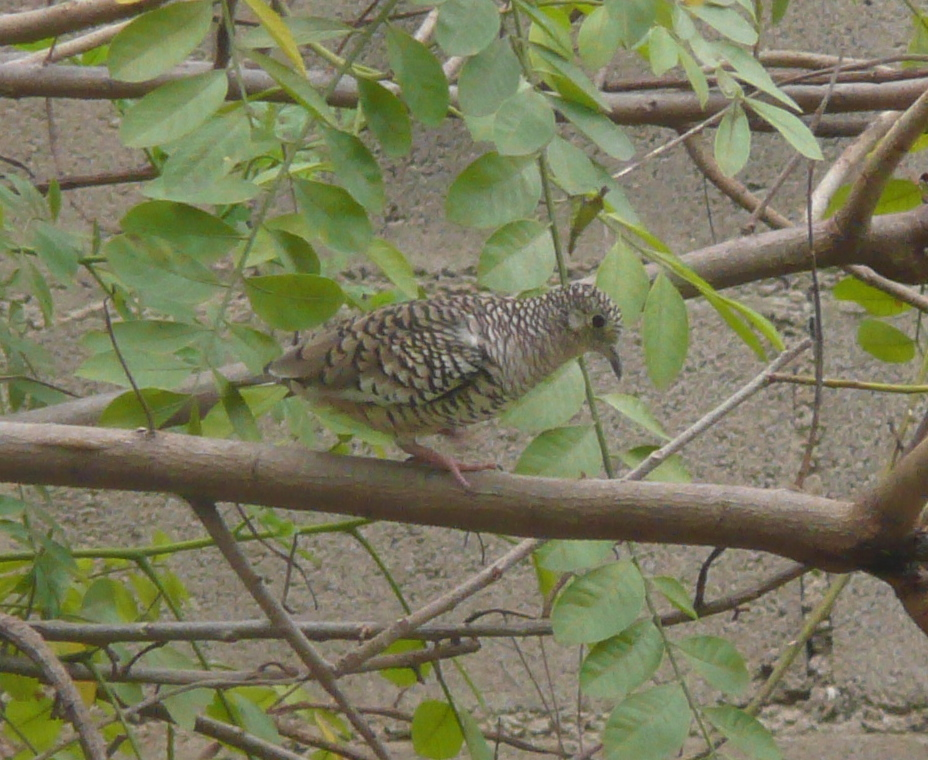
Subspecies C. s. ridgwayi Cagua, Aragua, Venezuela

The scaled dove (Columbina squammata), also known as scaly dove, Ridgway's dove, mottled dove, and South American zebra dove, is found in Brazil, Bolivia, Argentina, Colombia, French Guiana, Paraguay, Trinidad and Tobago,Venezuela and Uruguay.

Its natural habitats are subtropical or tropical dry shrubland, subtropical or tropical moist shrubland, subtropical or tropical seasonally wet or flooded lowland grassland, and heavily degraded former forest.

== Description ==
It measures between 18 and 22 centimeters in length and weighs between 48 and 60 grams. The species has grayish-brown upper parts and a pinkish-gray face and chest. The throat is white and the distal wing coverts are also white and form a visible white spot on the wings when they are closed. The tail is dark with the tips of the rectrices being white, forming a white band on the side of the tail, noticeable when the bird is in flight. The species has dark eyes, pink legs and gray beak. It has a "scaly" appearance caused by the dark edges of the feathers. The most striking feature of this species is the scaling pattern of the plumage, which provides it with efficient camouflage. When in flight you can see a white stripe at the base of the wing. Its primaries are brown in color.

== Taxonomy ==
The etymology of the scientific names comes from Latin, with the genus Columbina meaning "dove-like" from the Latin columba (meaning "dove") and with the specific epithet squammata meaning "scaled" from the Latin squamatus (also meaning "scaled), in reference to the bird's plumage.

In Brazilian Portuguese, this species has a variety of popular names, including: rolinha-carijó, Fogo-pagô (onomatopoeic), rol-pedrês, rolinha-cascavel, felix-cafofo (Paraíba), paruru and galinha-de-deus. In the Brazilian states of Rio Grande do Norte, Paraíba, and Pernambuco, this species is sometimes referred to as rolinha-cascavel, meaning "rattlesnake" due to the plumage pattern resembling the snake's scales and the sound that the bird makes when flying, which resembles the sound of the rattle of the local species of rattlesnake (Crotalus durissus).

There are two recognized subspecies:

- Columbina squammata squammata (Lesson, 1831) occurs in much of eastern Brazil, from southern Pará to northern Rio Grande do Sul, in Bolivia, Paraguay and northeastern Argentina
- Columbina squammata ridgwayi (Richmond, 1896) occurs from the northeastern coastal region of Colombia to Venezuela, in the Margarita and Trinidad Islands. It has more black at the tips of the feathers than the nominate subspecies.

== Behaviour ==
Columbina squammata is a dove of generally discreet habits, that walks in pairs or small groups by the edges of forests, savannahs, orchards, and other types of vegetation, while tending to avoid very open or very closed habitats. It is normally silent, except when vocalizing, which the bird only does while perched in well-hidden places, and except for the noise produced by the wings when the bird takes flight. In southeastern Brazil, it is considered as a skittish species, being much more heard than seen in cities like Campinas or Ribeirão Preto, but in other parts of Brazil, such as Brasília or Goiânia this species can be found much closer to people, scratching on sidewalks in the same way as its congener, the ruddy ground-dove (Columbina talpacoti).

Ornithologists and bird watchers in the state of São Paulo have been reporting a decline in the populations of this species, potentially attributing this decline to competition with the eared dove (Zenaida auriculata), which has been increasing in both range and abundance.

=== Breeding ===
It makes a nest of twigs in the shape of a cup, usually 1 or 2 meters above the ground, but may sometimes also nest on the ground. This species usually lays 2 white eggs.

=== Diet ===
It feeds on the ground, walking with its belly almost dragging on the ground. When scared, it flies sharply to nearby trees. The tree species Trema micrantha is one of the favorite fruits of this species.
