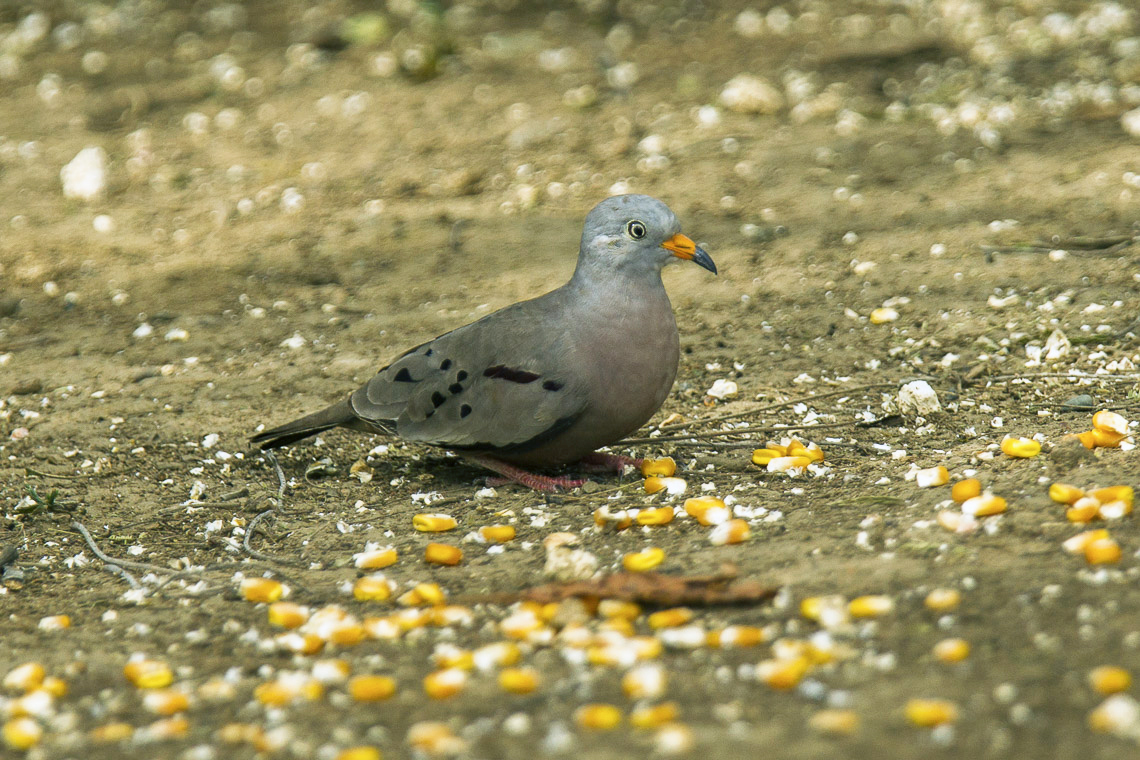

Conservation status
- Least Concern (IUCN 3.1)

Scientific classification
- Kingdom: Animalia
- Phylum: Chordata
- Class: Aves
- Order: Columbiformes
- Family: Columbidae
- Genus: Columbina
- Species: C. cruziana

Binomial name
- Columbina cruziana (Prévost, 1842)

Synonyms
- Eupelia cruziana; Columbigallina cruziana

= Croaking ground dove =

Species of bird

The croaking ground dove (Columbina cruziana) is a species of bird in the family Columbidae. It is found in Chile, Colombia, Ecuador, and Peru.

== Taxonomy and systematics ==
The croaking ground dove and Picui ground dove (Columbina picui) are sometimes considered sister species. The croaking ground dove is monotypic.

== Description ==
The croaking ground dove is 15 cm (5.9 in) long. Males weigh about 52 g (1.8 oz) and females 46 g (1.6 oz). The adult male's head is bluish gray, and its upperparts brownish gray. The central tail feathers are darker gray, and the outer ones black with white tips. The closed wing shows a dark bar and lines of dark spots. The breast and underparts are mauve pink. The eye is red with a white outer ring and is surrounded by bare yellow skin. Its fairly long bill is bright yellow near its base. The adult female's head is brown and the wing markings are less intense than the male's. Juveniles are similar to the female but their feathers have buffy tips.

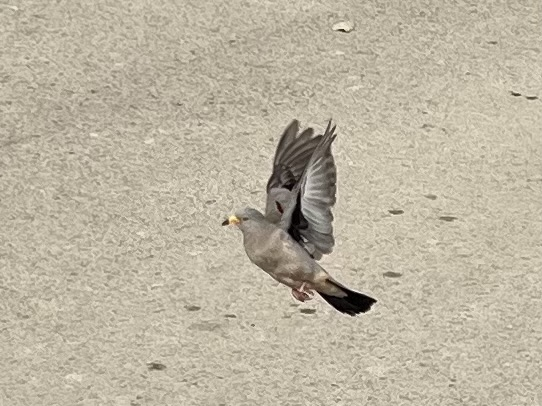
A specimen beginning to take flight

== Distribution and habitat ==
The croaking ground dove is found near the Pacific coast from Nariño Department in extreme southwestern Colombia through Ecuador and Peru to Chile's Tarapacá Region. Its range in Peru also includes the more inland Marañón Valley. It inhabits arid and semi-arid landscapes with scrub and riparian thickets, and is often found in farmland, gardens, and parks. Though it is mostly a bird of the lowlands, it can be found as high as 2,400 m (7,900 ft) in some areas.

== Behavior ==
=== Feeding ===
The croaking ground dove forages on the ground for seeds, but no details have been published.

=== Breeding ===
The croaking ground dove has bred in every month but September and October in the human-inhabited areas of southwestern Ecuador, but might be shorter away from human settlement. The species usually nests in bushes or trees and has also been recorded to nest on the ground and on building ledges, earthen banks, and low cliffs. The clutch size can be one to three, but is usually two.

=== Vocalization ===
The croaking ground dove's song is unlike that of any other dove, "a burry low-pitched overslurred rrRwl. It also produces some soft grunts and growls.

== Status ==
The IUCN has assessed the croaking ground dove as being of Least Concern. It appears to be common and increasing throughout its range, in part because it "[a]dapts successfully to anthropogenic habitats".
