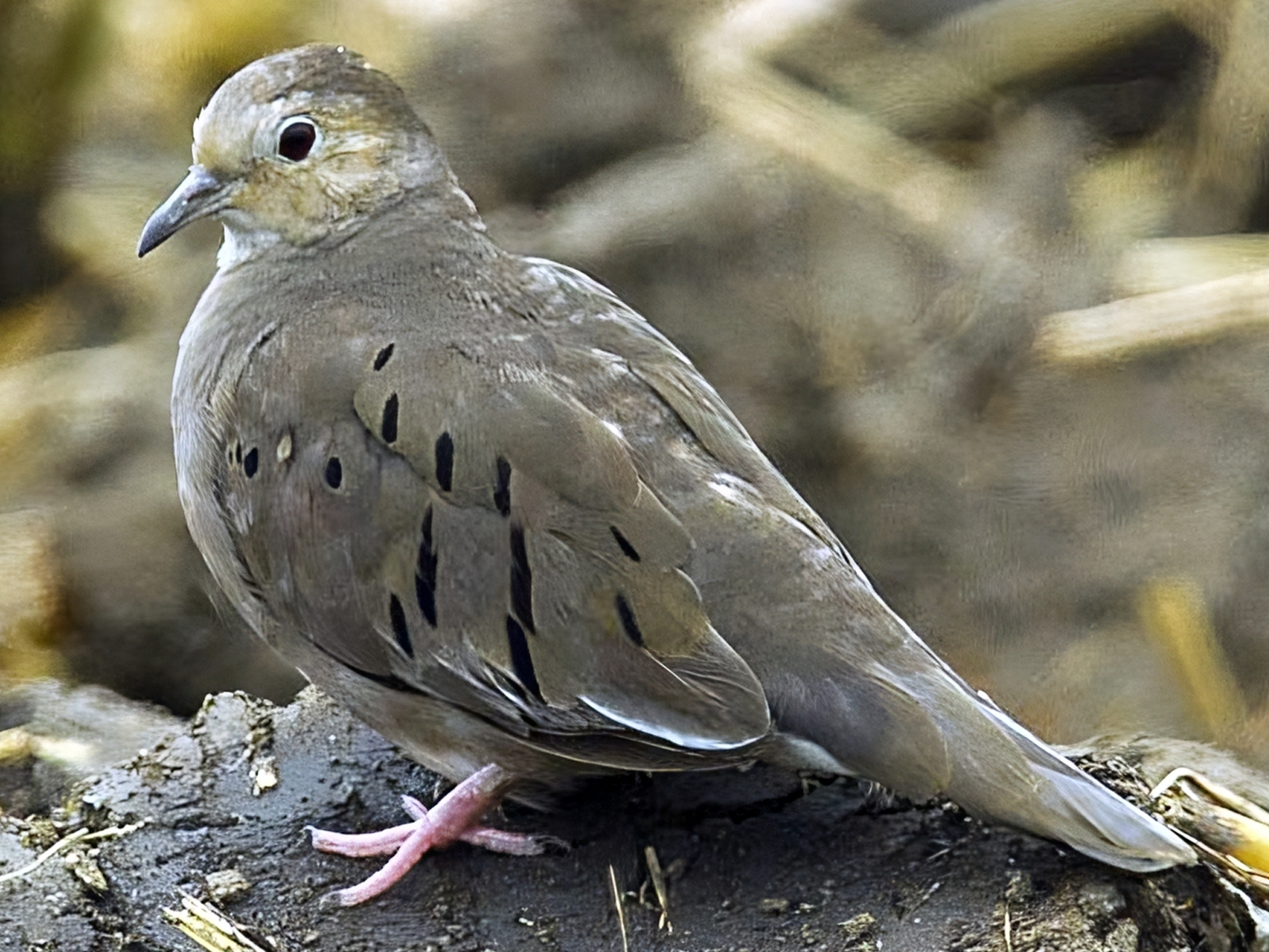

Conservation status
- Least Concern (IUCN 3.1)

Scientific classification
- Kingdom: Animalia
- Phylum: Chordata
- Class: Aves
- Order: Columbiformes
- Family: Columbidae
- Genus: Columbina
- Species: C. buckleyi

Binomial name
- Columbina buckleyi (Sclater, PL & Salvin, 1877)

Synonyms
- Chamaepelia buckleyi; Columbigallina buckleyi

= Ecuadorian ground dove =

Species of bird

The Ecuadorian ground dove (Columbina buckleyi) is a species of bird in the family Columbidae. It is found in Ecuador and Peru.

== Taxonomy and systematics ==
The Ecuadorian ground dove and three other species were for a time placed in genus Columbigallina, which was later merged into Columbina. It was also formerly treated as a subspecies of ruddy ground dove (C. talpacoti) and forms a superspecies with it now.

The Ecuadorian ground dove has two subspecies, the nominate C. b. buckleyi and C. b. dorsti.

== Description ==
The Ecuadorian ground dove is 18 cm (7.1 in) long and weighs about 57 g (2.0 oz). The male's forehead and face are grayish pink that darkens to a deep mauve pink on the breast and underparts. Its crown and nape are bluish gray and the upperparts brownish gray. The closed wing shows lines of black spots. The central tail feathers are gray and the rest black; the outermost have white tips. The female is browner than the male with less of a pink wash.

== Distribution and habitat ==
The nominate subspecies of Ecuadorian ground dove is found from Esmeraldas Province in north-western Ecuador south to Peru's far northern Department of Tumbes. C. b. dorsti is found separately, in the Marañon Valley of north-western Peru. They inhabit a range of landscapes including dry open semi-deciduous and deciduous woodland and thicker woodland, gardens, agricultural areas, and more humid young secondary forest. In elevation the species ranges from sea level to 2,000 m (6,600 ft).

== Behavior ==
=== Feeding ===
The Ecuadorian ground dove's feeding behavior and diet have not been studied, but it probably feeds on small seeds like others of its genus.

=== Breeding ===
Active nests of the Ecuadorian ground dove were found in February and March. They were strong and cup shaped, unlike the flimsy stick platforms of most other doves. They were placed in bushes or trees up to 7 m (23 ft) above ground and three of them contained two eggs.

=== Vocalization ===
The Ecuadorian ground dove's song is "a series of evenly-spaced, low-pitched slightly upslurred cooing notes...huWOO...huWOO...huWOO....".

== Status ==
The IUCN has assessed the Ecuadorian ground dove as being of Least Concern. Though it is thought to be fairly common, its "very small range and almost total lack of information regarding its biology indicate that at least some basic research is highly desirable."
