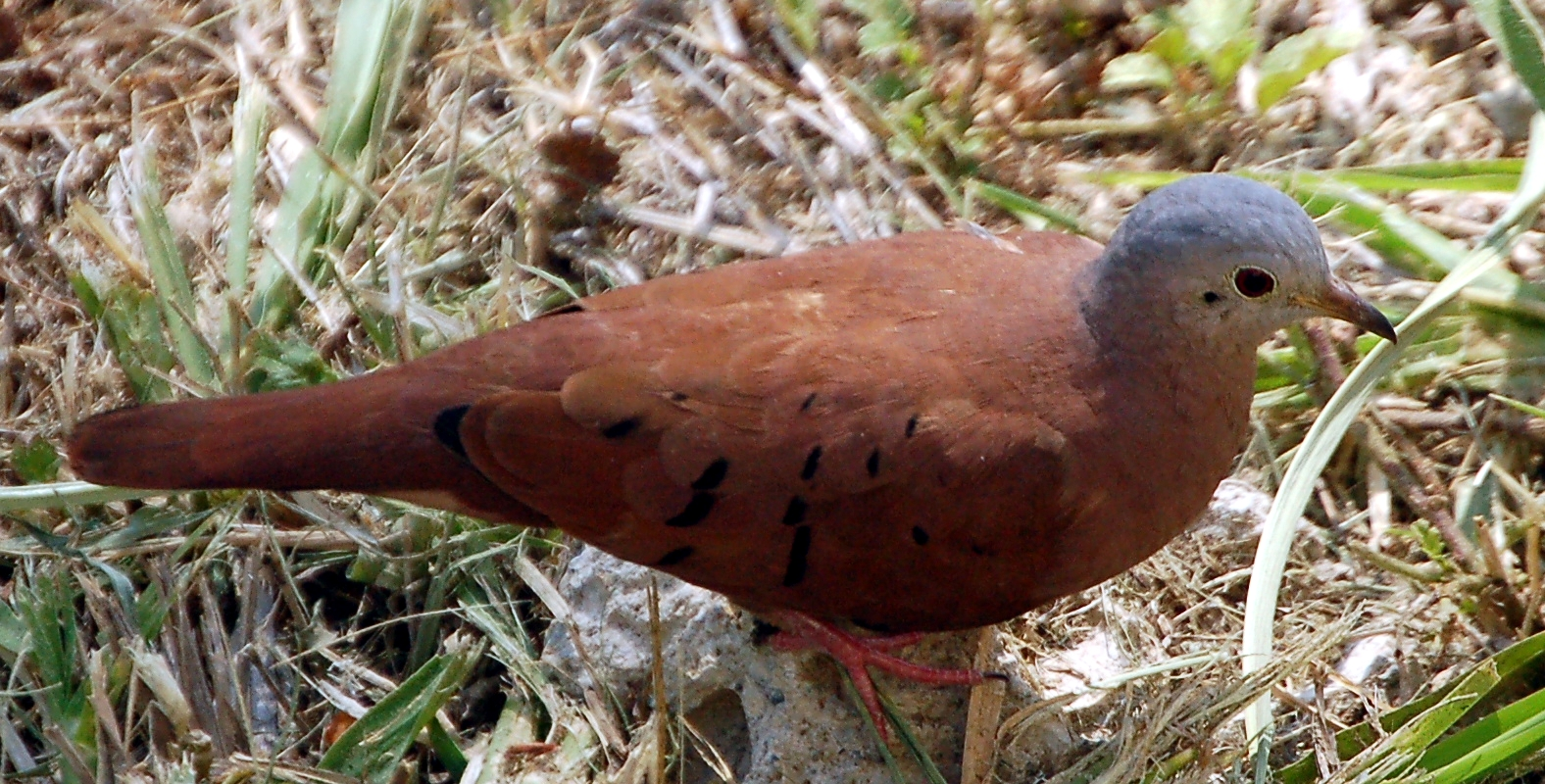
- Ruddy ground-dove, Columbina talpacoti

Scientific classification
- Kingdom: Animalia
- Phylum: Chordata
- Class: Aves
- Order: Columbiformes
- Family: Columbidae
- Subfamily: Claravinae
- Genus: Columbina; Spix, 1825

Type species
- Columbina strepitans von Spix, 1825

Species
- See text

Synonyms
- Columbigallina; Scardafella

= Columbina (bird) =

Genus of birds

Columbina is a genus of small doves in the family Columbidae that live in the New World. They range from the southern United States through Central America and much of South America. Columbina doves are normally found in pairs or small flocks and generally occur in open country. They have maroon irides and pinkish legs. In flight, some species show a distinctive flash of rufous in the wings, while others show black-and-white wing-patterns.

== Taxonomy ==
The genus was introduced in 1825 by the German naturalist Johann Baptist von Spix. The name is from Latin columbinus meaning "of a dove" or "dove-like". The type species was designated as the C. strepitans by English zoologist George Robert Gray in 1841. This taxon is now considered as a subspecies of the picui ground dove Columbina picui strepitans.

The genus contains nine species:

Image	Scientific name	Common name	Distribution
	Columbina inca	Inca dove	
	Columbina squamata	Scaled dove	northwestern and eastern South America
	Columbina passerina	Common ground dove	tropical Americas
	Columbina minuta	Plain-breasted ground dove	
	Columbina buckleyi	Ecuadorian ground dove	western Ecuador, nonwestern Peru
	Columbina talpacoti	Ruddy ground dove	
	Columbina picui	Picui ground dove	South America
	Columbina cruziana	Croaking ground dove	coastal Ecuador and Peru
	Columbina cyanopis	Blue-eyed ground dove	southern Cerrado
