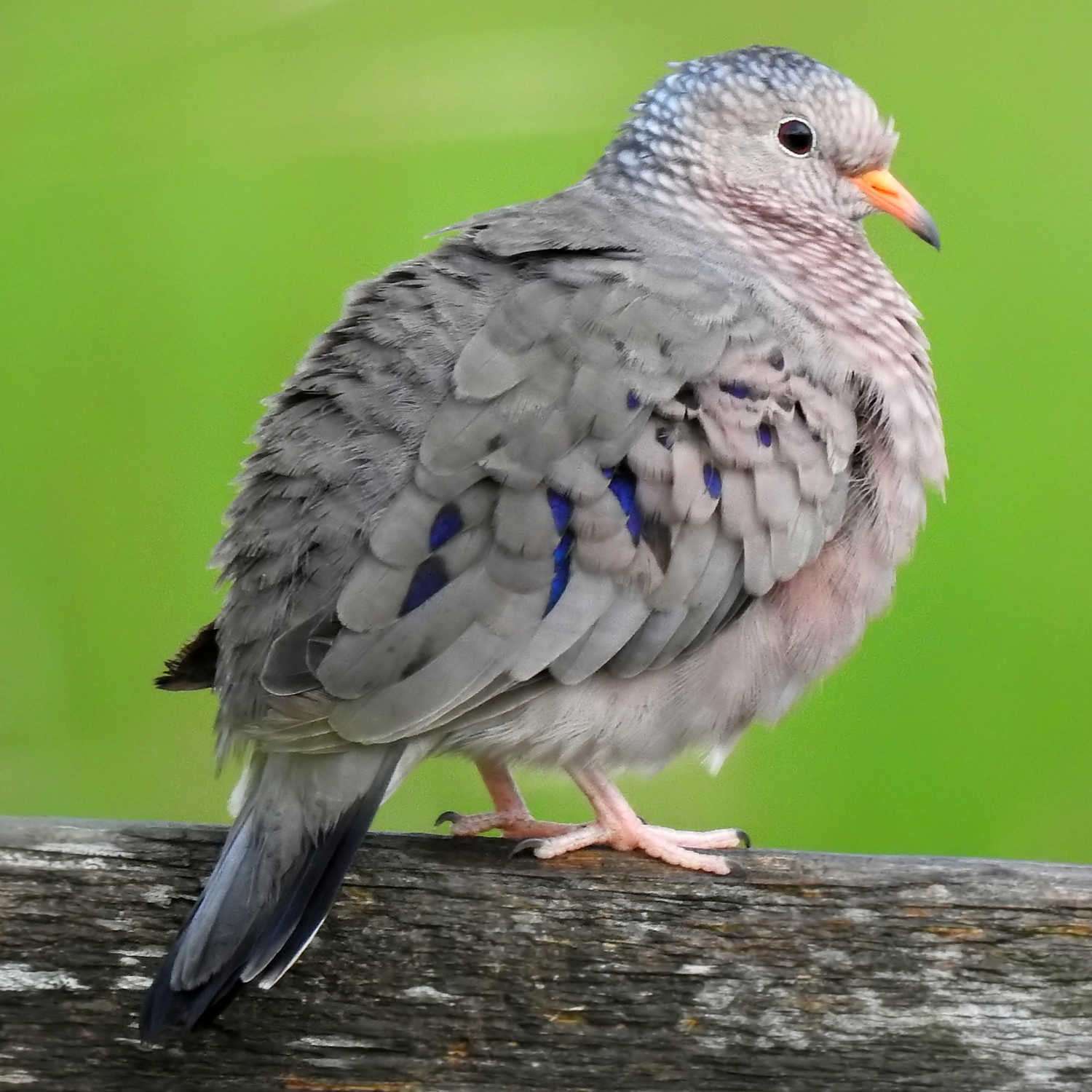
- At Kissimmee Prairie Preserve State Park, Florida, US

Conservation status
- Least Concern (IUCN 3.1)

Scientific classification
- Kingdom: Animalia
- Phylum: Chordata
- Class: Aves
- Order: Columbiformes
- Family: Columbidae
- Genus: Columbina
- Species: C. passerina

Binomial name
- Columbina passerina (Linnaeus, 1758)
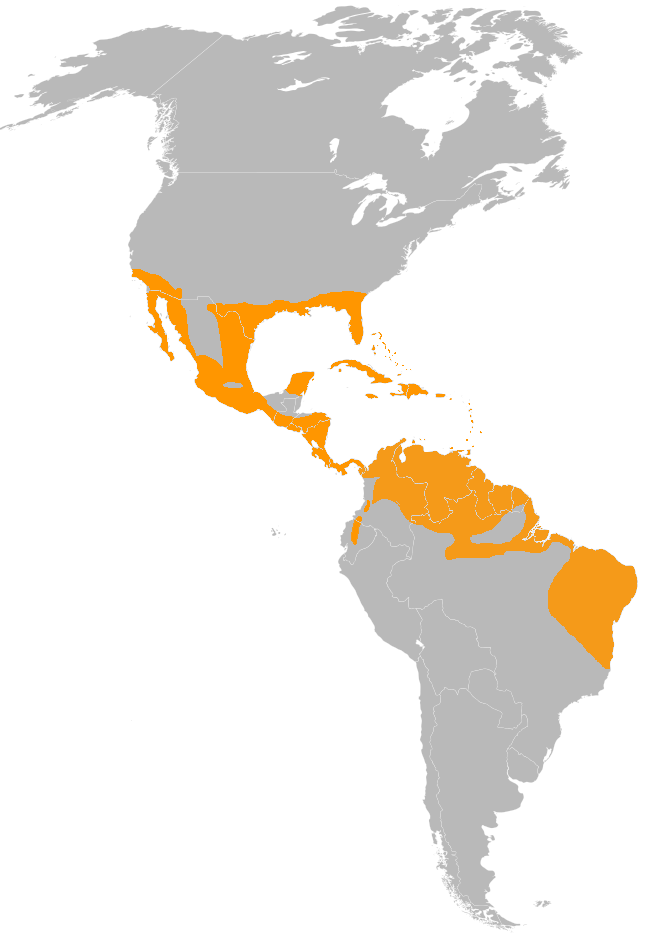
- Approximate range

Synonyms
- Columba passerina Linnaeus, 1758; Columbigallina passerina (Linnaeus, 1758)

= Common ground dove =

Species of bird

The common ground dove (Columbina passerina) is a small bird that inhabits the southern United States, parts of Central America, the Caribbean and northern South America. It is considered to be the smallest dove that inhabits the United States. As its name suggests, the bird spends the majority of its time on the ground, but can still fly.

== Taxonomy ==
The common ground dove was formally described by the Swedish naturalist Carl Linnaeus in 1758, in the tenth edition of his Systema Naturae. He placed it with all the other pigeons in the genus Columba and coined the binomial name Columba passerina. The specific name passerina is from the Latin passerinus meaning "sparrow-like". The species is now placed with other New World ground-doves in the genus Columbina that was introduced in 1825, by the German naturalist Johann Baptist von Spix. There are nine species in this genus including the Inca dove (Columbina inca) and the scaled dove (Columbina squammata).

There are 17 recognised subspecies:

- C. p. passerina (Linnaeus, 1758) – the nominate subspecies, southeastern United States
- C. p. pallescens (Baird, 1860) – southwest United States. Males are paler and females have more white on their underbelly.
- C. p. socorroensis (Ridgway, 1887) – Socorro Island, Mexico. They are darker brown than C. p. pallescens and have shorter wings as well.
- C. p. neglecta (Carriker, 1910) – Central America, from Honduras to Panama. They have darker feathers then C. p. pallescens.
- C. p. bahamensis (Maynard, 1887) – Bermuda and most of the Bahamas
- C. p. exigua (Riley, 1905) – Great Inagua Island (south Bahamas), Mona Island, Puerto Rico
- C. p. insularis (Ridgway, 1888) – Cuba, the Cayman Islands and Hispaniola (both the Dominican Republic and Haiti). Both its back and chest are darker than C. p. bahamensis.
- C. p. umbrina Buden, 1985 – Ile de la Tortue, Haiti. Darker on the back, and the bottom part of their beak is darker.
- C. p. jamaicensis (Maynard, 1899) – Jamaica; has a pale beak with males being very dark on the underbelly.
- C. p. portoricensis (Lowe, 1908) – Puerto Rico (except Mona Island) and the Virgin Islands (except St Croix). Similar to C. p. nigrirostris but the lower part of the beak is red.
- C. p. nigrirostris (Danforth, 1935) – northern Lesser Antilles, St. Croix in the Virgin Islands.
- C. p. trochila (Bonaparte, 1855) – Martinique. These birds have a greyish-green colouration on their chest and have chestnut tail feathers.
- C. p. antillarum (Lowe, 1908) – southern Lesser Antilles
- C. p. aflavida (Palmer and Riley, 1902) – north Colombia, north Venezuela, Netherlands Antilles, Trinidad. These doves are larger than usual, with males having darker brown underparts. Also, both males and females have darker bills.
- C. p. parvula (Todd, 1913) – central Colombia
- C. p. nana (Todd, 1913) – west Colombia
- C. p. quitensis (Todd, 1913) – central Ecuador

== Description ==
The common ground dove is North America's smallest and one of the world's smallest by mass. This species ranges from 15–18 cm (5.9–7.1 in) in length, spans 27 cm (11 in) across the wings, and weighs 26–40 g (0.92–1.41 oz). The common ground dove has a yellow beak with a black tip. Feathers surrounding the beak are pink in colour. The feathers on the head and the upper breast have a scale-like appearance. The tail feathers are very short and similar colour to the back. The plumage on the back of the bird is brown. The coverts and wing feathers are also brown but have black spotting on them. The common ground dove has chestnut primaries and wing borders, which can only be seen when the bird is flying. The common ground dove shows some sexual dimorphism in their plumage. The males have slate-gray feathers on the top of their heads and pink-gray colouration on their bellies. Females, on the other hand, are grayer than their male counterparts and are more evenly coloured.

The common ground dove's call can be described as soft whoops that increase in pitch. Often the call is heard in repetition and is quite distinct. To hear the call of the common ground dove, see the external links for a link to a website.

== Distribution and habitat ==
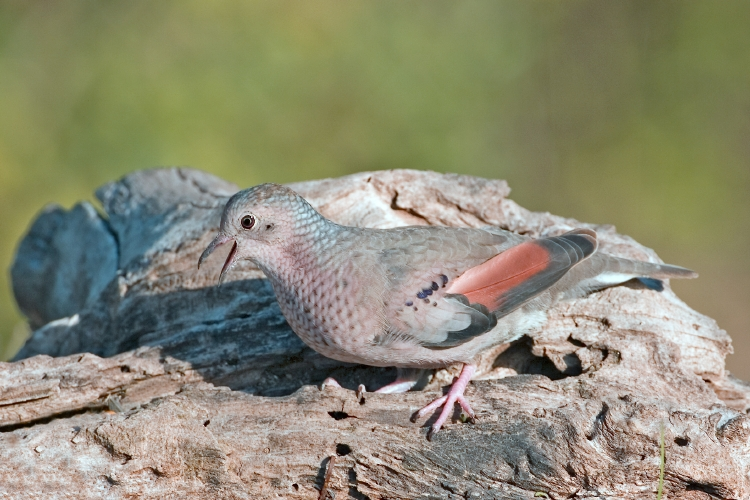
Common ground dove in Texas, 2005.

It is found in the southern tip of the United States, most of Mexico, parts of Central America, the Caribbean islands and northwestern South America. The common ground dove does not migrate and is a year-long resident in the areas they are found.

The common ground dove lives in open areas that have trees and bushes. They are also found in forests with sandy areas, farmlands, and savannahs and near human infrastructure. Common ground doves seem to hold territories but they are rarely aggressive when dealing with intruders.

== Behaviour ==
=== Diet ===
The common ground dove is a ground gleaner; as such it forages on the ground feeding on vegetation, seeds and fruits. It can also feed on insects and snails (including the shells), and will feed from bird feeders if available to them. They often eat while they are still moving and searching for other food items. Common ground doves can suck water into their beak and swallow it by lifting their heads, which is a common feature shared with other members of its family.

=== Breeding ===
The common ground dove mates with its partner for life. They build nests on the ground in vegetation or sometimes slightly off the ground in bushes. Their nests are quite simple, usually just a slight groove in the ground surrounded with plant material in a simple manner. The nests in bushes often are a simple structure of twigs and vegetation that are often fragile. They can become sexually active within 79 days after hatching. Nesting can occur between February and October; however, the peak of nesting occurs between early April and mid May. They can have 2–3 broods in any given year. On average, two white eggs are laid that are incubated by both parents for 12–14 days. The hatchlings are altricial at birth and covered in a small amount of gray down feathers. The young birds can fledge in 11 days. Both parents feed the young birds until they are ready to feed themselves.
