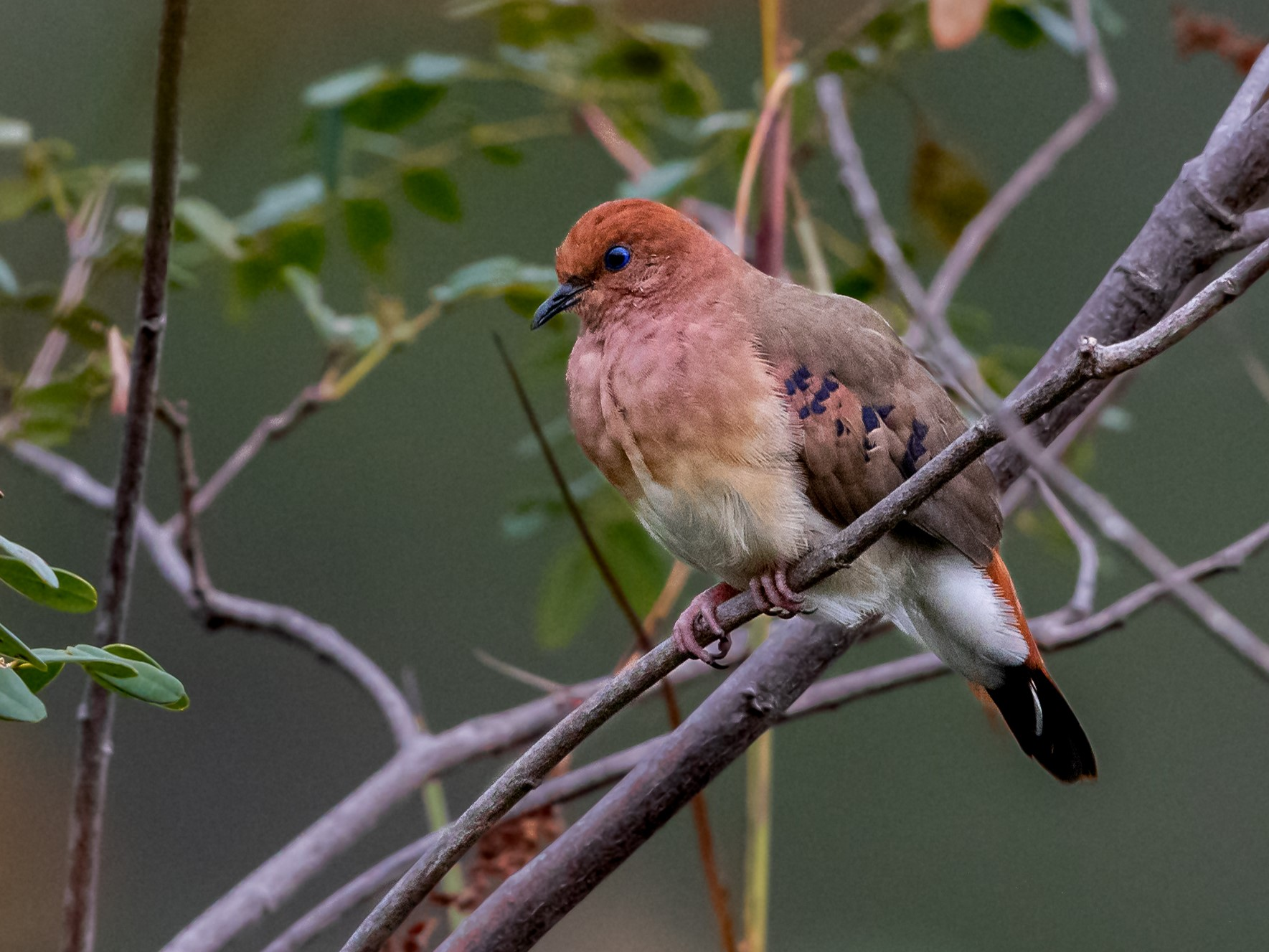
- Blue-eyed ground-dove

Conservation status
- Critically Endangered (IUCN 3.1)

Scientific classification
- Kingdom: Animalia
- Phylum: Chordata
- Class: Aves
- Order: Columbiformes
- Family: Columbidae
- Genus: Columbina
- Species: C. cyanopis

Binomial name
- Columbina cyanopis (Pelzeln, 1870)
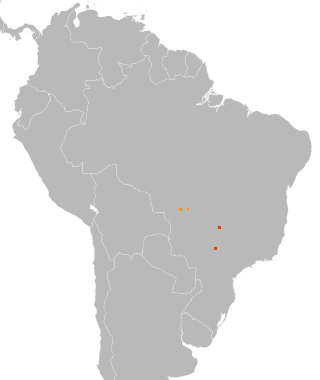
- Approximate ranges Extant (resident); Possibly extinct

Synonyms
- Oxypelia cyanopis

= Blue-eyed ground dove =

Species of bird

The blue-eyed ground dove (Columbina cyanopis) is a species of bird in the family Columbidae. It is endemic to the Cerrado region of Brazil.

== Taxonomy and systematics ==
The blue-eyed ground dove was for a time placed in the monotypic genus Oxypelia. That genus was merged into Columbina by the 1960s. Some plumage features set it apart from other Columbina species and more closely resemble those of the blue ground dove (Claravis pretiosa). The blue-eyed ground dove is monotypic.

A 2025 phylogenetic study found that the blue-eyed ground dove is more closely related to the genus Paraclaravis than the other species within Columbina, having diverged from Paraclaravis approximately 10 million years ago, suggesting that the monotypic genus Oxypelia should be resurrected.

== Description ==
The blue-eyed ground dove is 15.5 cm (6.1 in) long. The male's head, neck, wing coverts, uppertail coverts, and breast are purplish red. Its lower breast, belly, flanks, shoulders, and back are browner. Its vent and undertail coverts are white. The closed wing shows dark brown and chestnut with iridescent blue spots. The central tail feathers are rufous and the outer ones darker. Its eye is blue surrounded by bare gray skin. The adult female is paler, especially on its underparts. The juvenile has rufous edges on many feathers and the wing's spots are obscured.

== Distribution and habitat ==
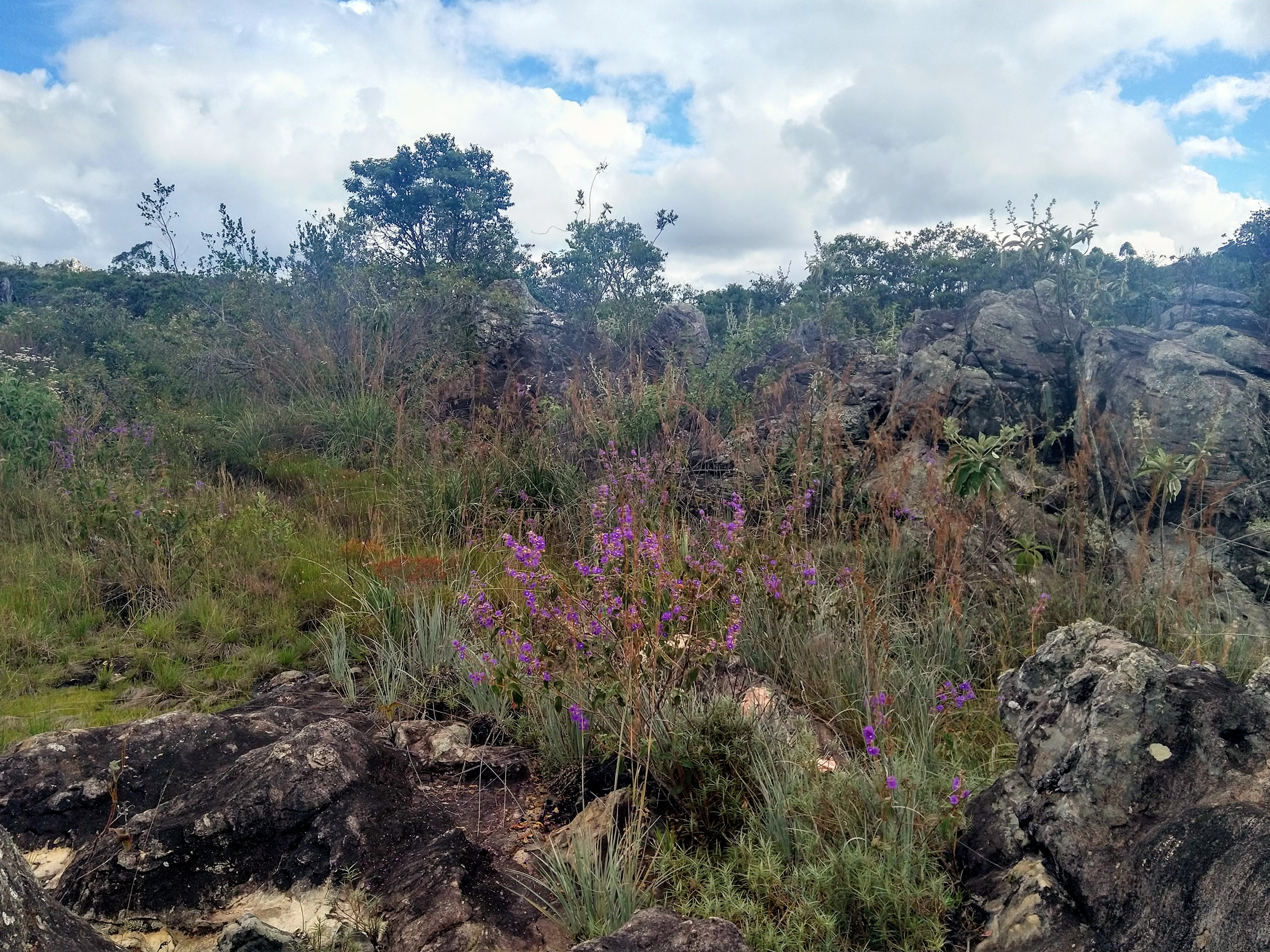
Habitat of the species in Botumirim, Minas Gerais.

The blue-eyed ground dove inhabits open savannah and grasslands in the Brazilian cerrado. The only reliable records since 1980 are in the states of Minas Gerais, Mato Grosso, and Mato Grosso do Sul, and only in the first of these have any been seen since 2007. There are historical records of specimens from Mato Grosso in the early 1800s, São Paulo in 1904, and Goiás in the early 1940s.

The species was rediscovered in 2015, and about 27 individuals among the only known population were left in 2017. In 2023, the chicks of this species were reared in captivity for the first time.

== Behavior ==
=== Feeding ===
No information on the blue-eyed ground dove's feeding behavior or diet has been published. It presumably feeds on seeds like the others of its genus.

=== Breeding ===
No information is available on the blue-eyed ground dove's breeding phenology.

=== Vocalization ===
The blue-eyed ground dove's song is "a series of evenly-spaced, soft cooing notes" rendered as "wah", "wuh" or "prrah". The notes of its song are given at a rate of around 1.5 notes per second.

== Status ==
The IUCN has assessed the blue-eyed ground dove as Critically Endangered. "This species is very rare with only few recent records, suggesting that the total population is extremely small. As of 2019, the blue-eyed ground dove population is estimated to fall between 50 - 249 mature individuals. A continuing decline is inferred from rapid rates of habitat loss in the region. The species is estimated to occur over a range of 650 km² (251 mi²). The Cerrado region in Brazil has become more of a pasture land, leading to difficulty for the doves trying to access the resources on the ground. The wild dogs and threats keep the doves away, which researchers believe is a major factor in the species endangerment."

The first photos of the species was taken in May 2016 in Minas Gerais after a sighting of at least 12 individuals in June 2015.
