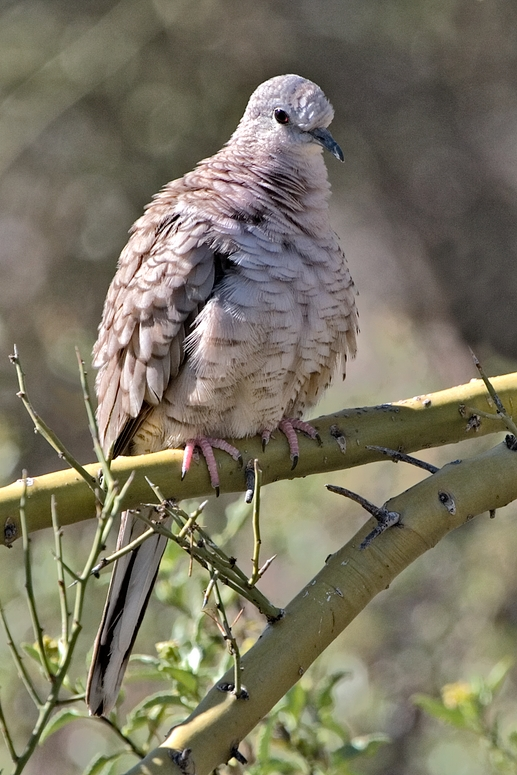

Conservation status
- Least Concern (IUCN 3.1)

Scientific classification
- Kingdom: Animalia
- Phylum: Chordata
- Class: Aves
- Order: Columbiformes
- Family: Columbidae
- Genus: Columbina
- Species: C. inca

Binomial name
- Columbina inca (Lesson, 1847)

Synonyms
- Scardafella inca

= Inca dove =

Species of bird

The Inca dove or Mexican dove (Columbina inca) is a small New World dove. The species was first described by French surgeon and naturalist René Lesson in 1847. It reaches a length of 16.5–23 cm (6.5–9.1 in) and weighs 30–58 g (1.1–2.0 oz). The Inca dove has an average wingspan of 28.5 cm and a max wingspan of 32 cm. It is a slender species, with a gray-brown body covered in feathers that resemble a scaled pattern. The tail is long and square and edged with white feathers that may flare out in flight. The underwings are reddish, like other ground doves, and upon takeoff, the wings produce a distinctive, quiet rattling noise.

== Distribution and habitat ==
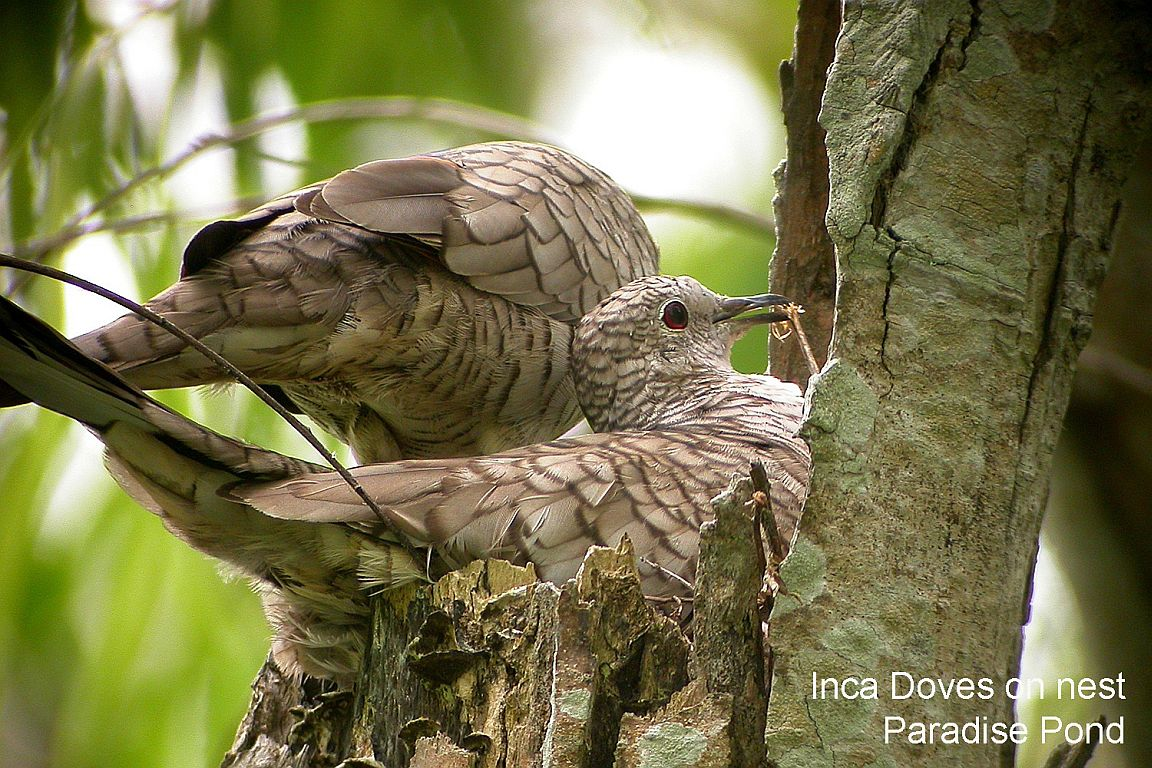
A pair of Inca doves nesting

The Inca dove ranges from Costa Rica in the south to the American Southwest in the north and is often common to abundant in suitable habitat. Its range has been expanding northward and southward the past few decades. Despite being named after the Inca Empire, this species does not occur in any of the lands that once constituted that empire. Inca doves are expanding their range in the north and south. This terrestrial species forms flocks in deserts, scrublands and cultivated areas and may also be found in urban settings where they feed upon grass seeds and take advantage of the ready availability of water from agricultural and suburban irrigation.

The Inca dove has in the past escaped or been deliberately released in the US state of Florida, but there is no evidence that the population is breeding and may only persist due to continuing releases or escapes.

== Nesting ==
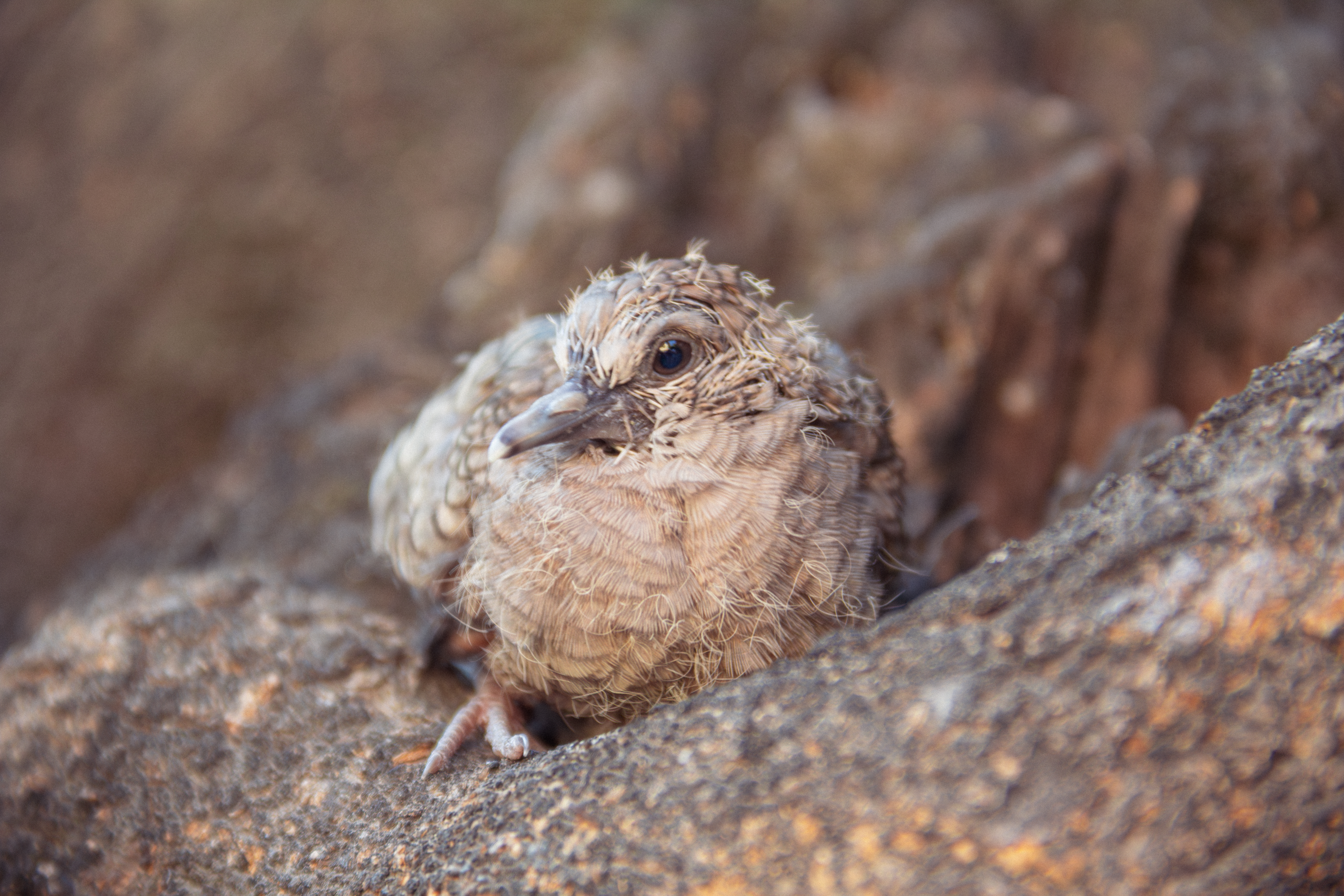
An Inca dovelet in Mexico City, Mexico

Inca doves build their nests primarily in trees and shrubs. The average diameter is about 5 centimeters. The male gathers nesting material and presents it to the female, who also gathers some nesting material. The nest is composed of twigs, grass, weed stalks, and leaves and becomes reinforced with the brood's excrement. The nest is often used over and over.

== Behavior ==
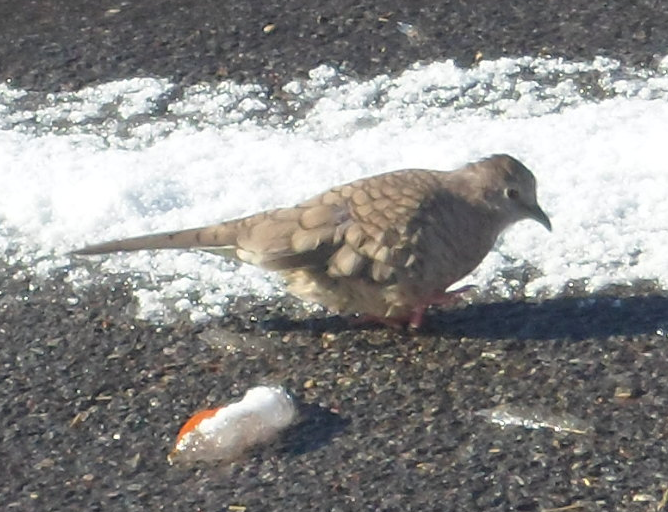
Inca dove in Chihuahua, Mexico

During winter, Inca doves roost in communal huddles, in a pyramid formation that aids in body-heat retention. These pyramids can contain 10 or more birds. They often flock outside of their territories, with flocks growing up to 100 birds-strong.

== Voice ==
The song, a forceful cooing rendered variously as cowl-coo, POO-pup, or NO-hope, may be given from a tree, wire, or other open, high perch such as a television aerial.
