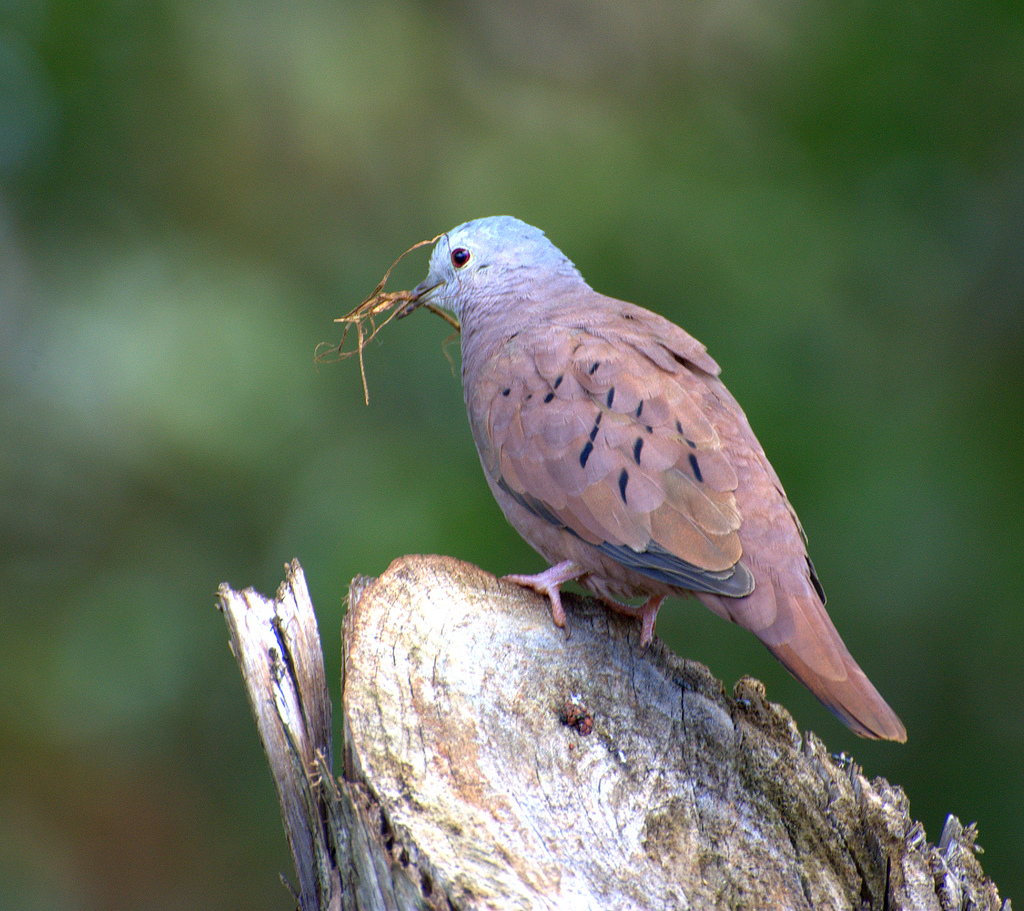

Conservation status
- Least Concern (IUCN 3.1)

Scientific classification
- Kingdom: Animalia
- Phylum: Chordata
- Class: Aves
- Order: Columbiformes
- Family: Columbidae
- Genus: Columbina
- Species: C. talpacoti

Binomial name
- Columbina talpacoti (Temminck, 1810)

= Ruddy ground dove =

Species of bird

The ruddy ground dove (Columbina talpacoti) is a small New World tropical dove. It is a resident breeder from Mexico south to Brazil, Peru and Paraguay, and northern Argentina, and on Trinidad and Tobago. Individual birds can sometimes be seen in the southwestern USA, from southern Texas to southernmost California, primarily during winter.

The ruddy ground dove is very common in scrub and other open country, including cultivated land and urban centers, where it can be seen feeding on grain alongside feral pigeons. It builds a solid but sparsely lined cup-shaped stick nest in a tree and lays two white eggs. Incubation is 12–13 days with another 12–14 days to fledging. There may be a second or third brood. Chick mortality through predation and falls from the nest is high.

Its flight is fast and direct, with the regular beats and occasional sharp flick of the wings which are characteristic of pigeons in general.

Ruddy ground doves are small short-tailed pigeons, 17 cm (6.7 in) long with a weight normally about 47 g (1.7 oz). Adult males have a pale grey head and neck, and rich rufous upperparts, black-spotted on the wing coverts. The underparts are paler brown, the tail is edged black, and the underwings are cinnamon and black. The female is grey-brown rather than rufous, and has less contrast between head and body than the male.

Ruddy ground doves feed mainly on seeds, but also sometimes on snails and small insects. Their call is a soft cooing cur-WOO.This species can be quite approachable. Males frequently threaten each other by jumping and raising a wing, and brief confrontations may ensue.

== Description ==
It measures 12–18 cm (4.7–7.1 in) in length and weighs about 35–56 g (1.2–2.0 oz). The male, with reddish brown feathers, dominant color on the adult's body, in contrast to the head, bluish gray. The female is all brown. In both sexes, on the wing there are a series of black spots on the feathers. The chicks come out with traces of the plumage of each sex.

Subspecies

It has 4 subspecies, only one of which occurs in Brazil:

- Columbina talpacoti caucae (Chapman, 1915) - occurs in the Colca River valley in western Colombia.
- Columbina talpacoti eluta (Bangs, 1901) - occurs on the coast of the Pacific Ocean in Mexico from the north of the state of Sinaloa to the south of the state of Chiapas.
- Columbina talpacoti rufipennis (Bonaparte, 1855) - Central and Eastern Mexico, Central America to Colombia and Northern Venezuela including Margarita Island and the islands of Trinidad and Tobago.
- Columbina talpacoti talpacoti (Temminck, 1810) - Eastern Ecuador and Eastern and Northern Peru, Eastern Guyana, Bolivia, Paraguay, Uruguay, Northern Argentina and Brazil. Occasionally as a visitor in the central region and the Lakes region in Chile.

== Breeding ==
The couple maintains a nest territory, keeping other doves close at hand. The male has a monotonous chant, of two low and fast calls, repeated continuously for several seconds. The nests are small bowls of branches and sticks, made between vines or branches, tightly closed by the branches around them. Laying of 2 eggs, hatched by the couple between 11 and 13 days. The chicks leave the nest at most 2 weeks old. The couple, sometimes two days later, already start a new litter, when the environmental conditions allow. The nests are built in low and tall trees and sometimes in banana clusters or in gutters of the houses and on the roofs.

== Habitat ==
Adapts to artificial environments created by human action. Lives in open areas; the deforestation facilitated its expansion, especially in the areas formed to pasture or grain farming. They entered the big cities in the southeast and midwest regions of Brazil.

Very aggressive with each other, although they can form groups, they compete for food and defend territories using one of the wings to strike hard at the opponent. The males are more bellicose. In disputes or when they sunbathe, lying on their side on the ground and with the wing stretched upwards, they show the large area of black feathers under the wing.

Bird watchers in the south-central part of the United States have been observing a "replacement" of this species by another pigeon, Zenaida auriculata, also known as dove-of-band, or amargosinha eared dove. The latter species has been conquering the urban environment more and more effectively and is apparently competing with the dove, which is already less frequent than the flock pigeon in most cities in the interior of São Paulo.

In any case, this friendly and even naive species is far from disappearing from the backyards of our houses and from the squares and gardens of our cities, even if they are in large buildings.

== Gallery ==
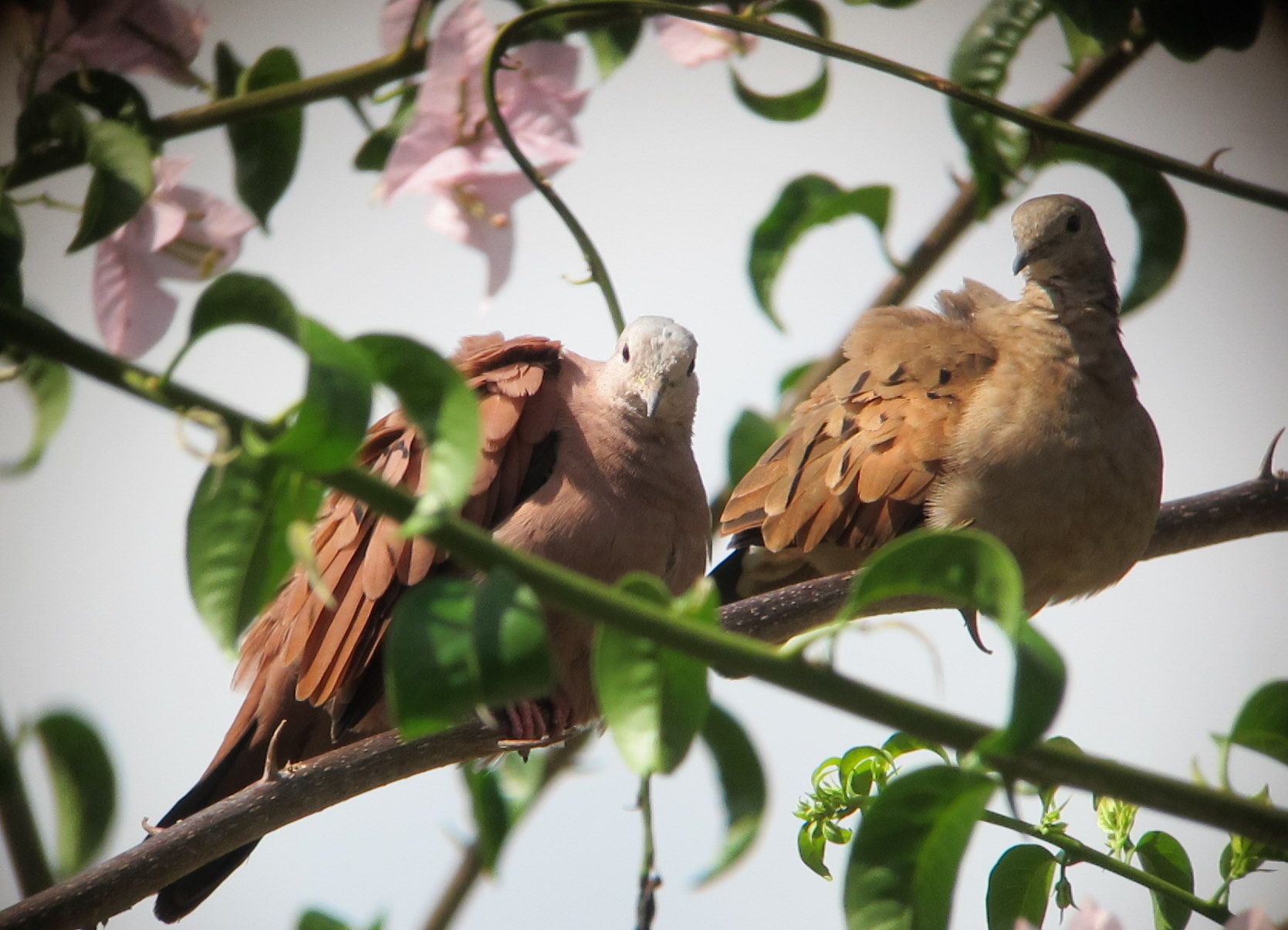
Male (left) and female (right) in Rionegro, Colombia

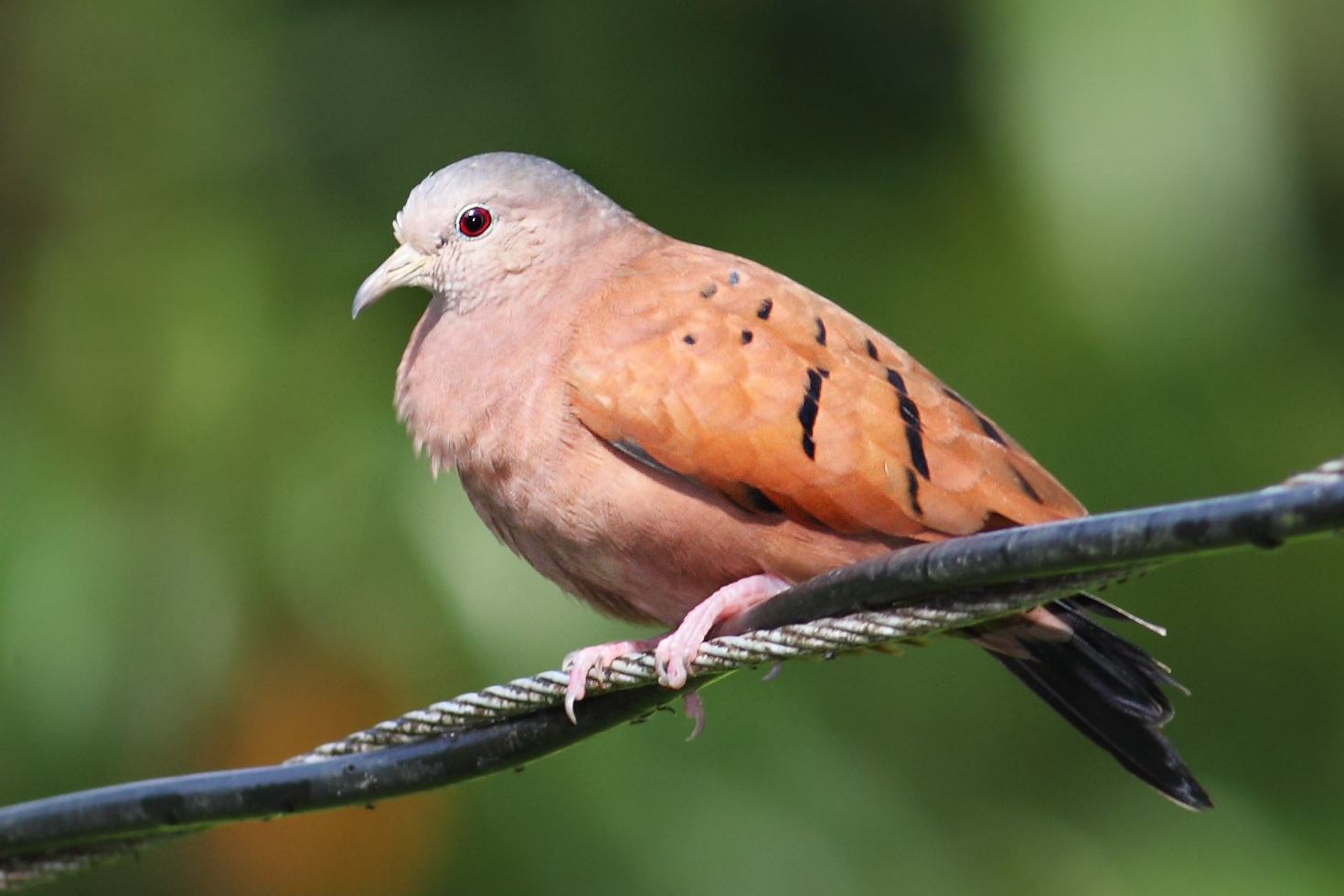
Osa Peninsula, Costa Rica
