= List of birds of Paraguay =

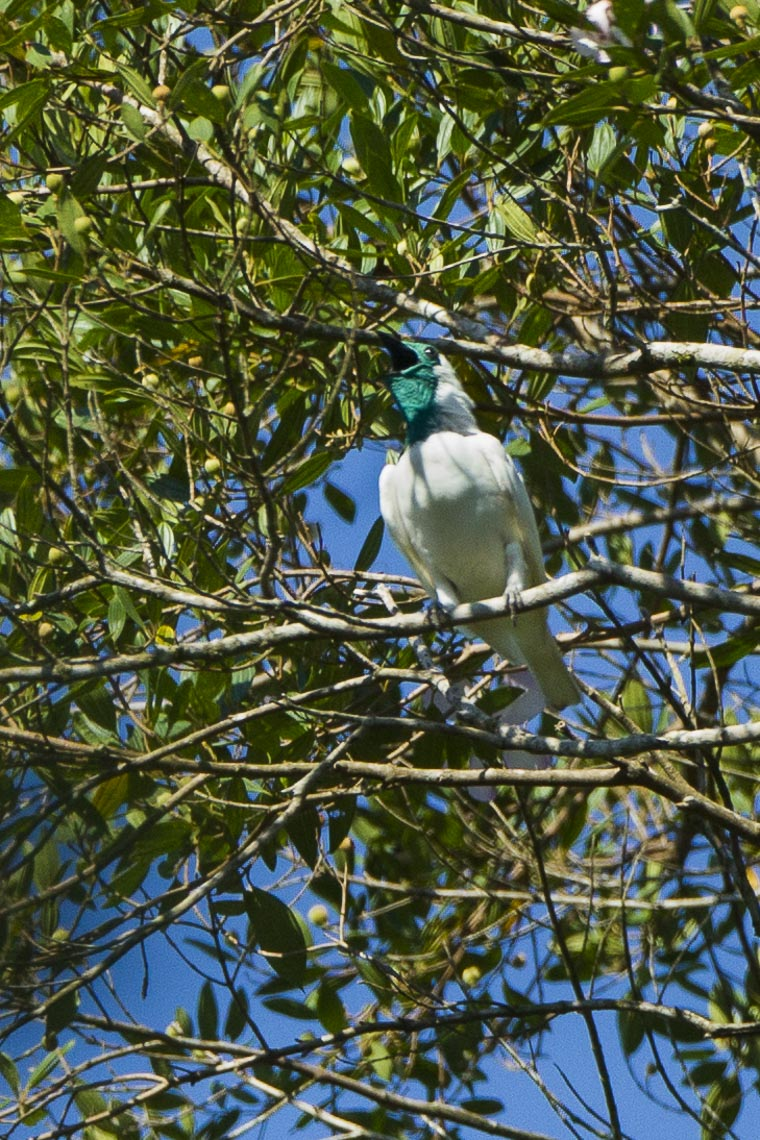
The bare-throated bellbird is the national bird of Paraguay.

This is a list of the bird species recorded in Paraguay. The avifauna of Paraguay has 694 confirmed species, of which two have been introduced by humans, 38 are rare or vagrants, and five are extirpated or extinct. An additional 27 species are unconfirmed (see below). None are endemic. An additional vagrant species is added from another source and is not included in the above counts.

Except as an entry is cited otherwise, the list of species is that of the South American Classification Committee (SACC). The list's taxonomic treatment (designation and sequence of orders, families, and species) and nomenclature (common and scientific names) are also those of the SACC unless noted otherwise. Capitalization within English names follows Wikipedia practice, i.e. only the first word of a name is capitalized unless a place name such as São Paulo is used.

The following tags have been used to highlight certain categories of occurrence.

- (V) Vagrant - a species that rarely or accidentally occurs in Paraguay
- (E) Endemic - a species endemic to Paraguay
- (I) Introduced - a species introduced to Paraguay as a consequence, direct or indirect, of human actions
- (U) Unconfirmed - a species recorded but with "no tangible evidence" according to the SACC

== Rheas ==
Order: Rheiformes Family: Rheidae

The rheas are large flightless birds native to South America. Their feet have three toes rather than four which allows them to run faster. One species has been recorded in Paraguay.

- Greater rhea, Rhea americana

== Tinamous ==
Order: Tinamiformes Family: Tinamidae

The tinamous are among the most ancient groups of birds. Although they look similar to other ground-dwelling birds like quail and grouse, they have no close relatives and are classified as a single family, Tinamidae, within their own order, the Tinamiformes. Twelve species have been recorded in Paraguay.

- Solitary tinamou, Tinamus solitarius
- Brown tinamou, Crypturellus obsoletus
- Undulated tinamou, Crypturellus undulatus
- Small-billed tinamou, Crypturellus parvirostris
- Tataupa tinamou, Crypturellus tataupa
- Red-winged tinamou, Rhynchotus rufescens
- Brushland tinamou, Nothoprocta cinerascens
- White-bellied nothura, Nothura boraquira
- Lesser nothura, Nothura minor
- Spotted nothura, Nothura maculosa
- Dwarf tinamou, Taoniscus nanus (U)
- Quebracho crested-tinamou, Eudromia formosa

== Screamers ==
Order: Anseriformes Family: Anhimidae

The screamers are a small family of birds related to the ducks. They are large, bulky birds, with a small downy head, long legs and large feet which are only partially webbed. They have large spurs on their wings which are used in fights over mates and in territorial disputes. Two species have been recorded in Paraguay.

- Horned screamer, Anhima cornuta
- Southern screamer, Chauna torquata

== Ducks ==
Order: Anseriformes Family: Anatidae

Anatidae includes the ducks and most duck-like waterfowl, such as geese and swans. These birds are adapted to an aquatic existence with webbed feet, flattened bills, and feathers that are excellent at shedding water due to an oily coating. Twenty-two species have been recorded in Paraguay.

- Fulvous whistling-duck, Dendrocygna bicolor
- White-faced whistling-duck, Dendrocygna viduata
- Black-bellied whistling-duck, Dendrocygna autumnalis
- Coscoroba swan, Coscoroba coscoroba
- Orinoco goose, Oressochen jubata (V)
- Muscovy duck, Cairina moschata
- Comb duck, Sarkidiornis sylvicola
- Ringed teal, Callonetta leucophrys
- Brazilian teal, Amazonetta brasiliensis
- Silver teal, Spatula versicolor
- Red shoveler, Spatula platalea
- Blue-winged teal, Spatula discors (U)
- Cinnamon teal, Spatula cyanoptera
- White-cheeked pintail, Anas bahamensis
- Yellow-billed pintail, Anas georgica (V)
- Yellow-billed teal, Anas flavirostris (V)
- Southern pochard, Netta erythrophthalma (U)
- Rosy-billed pochard, Netta peposaca
- Brazilian merganser, Mergus octosetaceus (extirpated)
- Black-headed duck, Heteronetta atricapilla
- Masked duck, Nomonyx dominicus
- Lake duck, Oxyura vittata (V)

== Guans ==
Order: Galliformes Family: Cracidae

The Cracidae are large birds, similar in general appearance to turkeys. The guans and curassows live in trees, but the smaller chachalacas are found in more open scrubby habitats. They are generally dull-plumaged, but the curassows and some guans have colorful facial ornaments. Six species have been recorded in Paraguay.

- Rusty-margined guan, Penelope superciliaris
- Dusky-legged guan, Penelope obscura (U)
- Blue-throated piping-guan, Pipile cumanensis
- Black-fronted piping-guan, Pipile jacutinga
- Chaco chachalaca, Ortalis canicollis
- Bare-faced curassow, Crax fasciolata

== New World quails ==
Order: Galliformes Family: Odontophoridae

The New World quails are small, plump terrestrial birds only distantly related to the quails of the Old World, but named for their similar appearance and habits. One species has been recorded in Paraguay.

- Spot-winged wood-quail, Odontophorus capueira

== Flamingos ==
Order: Phoenicopteriformes Family: Phoenicopteridae

Flamingos are gregarious wading birds, usually 3 to 5 feet (0.9 to 1.5 m) tall, found in both the Western and Eastern Hemispheres. Flamingos filter-feed on shellfish and algae. Their oddly shaped beaks are specially adapted to separate mud and silt from the food they consume and, uniquely, are used upside-down. One species has been recorded in Paraguay.

- Chilean flamingo, Phoenicopterus chilensis

== Grebes ==
Order: Podicipediformes Family: Podicipedidae

Grebes are small to medium-large freshwater diving birds. They have lobed toes and are excellent swimmers and divers. However, they have their feet placed far back on the body, making them quite ungainly on land. Five species have been recorded in Paraguay.

- White-tufted grebe, Rollandia rolland
- Least grebe, Tachybaptus dominicus
- Pied-billed grebe, Podilymbus podiceps
- Great grebe, Podiceps major (V)
- Silvery grebe, Podiceps occipitalis

== Pigeons ==
Order: Columbiformes Family: Columbidae

Pigeons and doves are stout-bodied birds with short necks and short slender bills with a fleshy cere. Sixteen species have been recorded in Paraguay.

- Rock pigeon, Columba livia (I)
- Scaled pigeon, Patagioenas speciosa
- Picazuro pigeon, Patagioenas picazuro
- Spot-winged pigeon, Patagioenas maculosa
- Pale-vented pigeon, Patagioenas cayennensis
- Ruddy quail-dove, Geotrygon montana
- Violaceous quail-dove, Geotrygon violacea
- White-tipped dove, Leptotila verreauxi
- Gray-fronted dove, Leptotila rufaxilla
- Eared dove, Zenaida auriculata
- Blue ground dove, Claravis pretiosa
- Purple-winged ground dove, Paraclaravis geoffroyi
- Plain-breasted ground dove, Columbina minuta
- Ruddy ground dove, Columbina talpacoti
- Scaled dove, Columbina squammata
- Picui ground dove, Columbina picui

== Cuckoos ==
Order: Cuculiformes Family: Cuculidae

The family Cuculidae includes cuckoos, roadrunners, and anis. These birds are of variable size with slender bodies, long tails, and strong legs. Thirteen species have been recorded in Paraguay.

- Guira cuckoo, Guira guira
- Greater ani, Crotophaga major
- Smooth-billed ani, Crotophaga ani
- Striped cuckoo, Tapera naevia
- Pheasant cuckoo, Dromococcyx phasianellus
- Pavonine cuckoo, Dromococcyx pavoninus
- Little cuckoo, Coccycua minuta (U)
- Ash-colored cuckoo, Coccycua cinerea
- Squirrel cuckoo, Piaya cayana
- Dark-billed cuckoo, Coccyzus melacoryphus
- Yellow-billed cuckoo, Coccyzus americanus
- Pearly-breasted cuckoo, Coccyzus euleri
- Black-billed cuckoo, Coccyzus erythropthalmus (V)

== Potoos ==
Order: Nyctibiiformes Family: Nyctibiidae

The potoos (sometimes called poor-me-ones) are large near passerine birds related to the nightjars and frogmouths. They are nocturnal insectivores which lack the bristles around the mouth found in the true nightjars. There are seven species, of which three have been recorded in Paraguay.

- Great potoo, Nyctibius grandis
- Long-tailed potoo, Nyctibius aethereus
- Common potoo, Nyctibius griseus

== Nightjars ==
Order: Caprimulgiformes Family: Caprimulgidae

Nightjars are medium-sized nocturnal birds that usually nest on the ground. They have long wings, short legs, and very short bills. Most have small feet, of little use for walking, and long pointed wings. Their soft plumage is camouflaged to resemble bark or leaves. Sixteen species have been recorded in Paraguay.

- Nacunda nighthawk, Chordeiles nacunda
- Lesser nighthawk, Chordeiles acutipennis (U)
- Common nighthawk, Chordeiles minor
- Band-tailed nighthawk, Nyctiprogne leucopyga
- Short-tailed nighthawk, Lurocalis semitorquatus
- Common pauraque, Nyctidromus albicollis
- Little nightjar, Setopagis parvula
- Spot-tailed nightjar, Hydropsalis maculicaudus
- Long-trained nightjar, Hydropsalis forcipata (V)
- Scissor-tailed nightjar, Hydropsalis torquata
- Band-winged nightjar, Systellura longirostris
- White-winged nightjar, Eleothreptus candicans
- Sickle-winged nightjar, Eleothreptus anomalus
- Ocellated poorwill, Nyctiphrynus ocellatus
- Silky-tailed nightjar, Antrostomus sericocaudatus
- Rufous nightjar, Antrostomus rufus

== Swifts ==
Order: Apodiformes Family: Apodidae

Swifts are small birds which spend the majority of their lives flying. These birds have very short legs and never settle voluntarily on the ground, perching instead only on vertical surfaces. Many swifts have long swept-back wings which resemble a crescent or boomerang. Six species have been recorded in Paraguay.

- Sooty swift, Cypseloides fumigatus
- Great dusky swift, Cypseloides senex
- White-collared swift, Streptoprocne zonaris
- Biscutate swift, Streptoprocne biscutata (U)
- Gray-rumped swift, Chaetura cinereiventris
- Sick's swift, Chaetura meridionalis

== Hummingbirds ==
Order: Apodiformes Family: Trochilidae

Hummingbirds are small birds capable of hovering in mid-air due to the rapid flapping of their wings. They are the only birds that can fly backwards. Twenty species have been recorded in Paraguay.

- Black jacobin, Florisuga fusca
- Buff-bellied hermit, Phaethornis subochraceus (V)
- Planalto hermit, Phaethornis pretrei
- Scale-throated hermit, Phaethornis eurynome
- White-vented violetear, Colibri serrirostris
- White-tailed goldenthroat, Polytmus guainumbi
- Ruby-topaz hummingbird, Chrysolampis mosquitus (U)
- Black-throated mango, Anthracothorax nigricollis
- Long-billed starthroat, Heliomaster longirostris (U)
- Blue-tufted starthroat, Heliomaster furcifer
- Amethyst woodstar, Calliphlox amethystina
- Glittering-bellied emerald, Chlorostilbon lucidus
- Purple-crowned plovercrest, Stephanoxis loddigesii
- Swallow-tailed hummingbird, Eupetomena macroura
- Fork-tailed woodnymph, Thalurania furcata
- Violet-capped woodnymph, Thalurania glaucopis
- Versicolored emerald, Chrysuronia versicolor
- White-throated hummingbird, Leucochloris albicollis
- Rufous-throated sapphire, Hylocharis sapphirina (U)
- Gilded hummingbird, Hylocharis chrysura

== Limpkin ==
Order: Gruiformes Family: Aramidae

The limpkin resembles a large rail. It has drab-brown plumage and a grayer head and neck.

- Limpkin, Aramus guarauna

== Rails ==
Order: Gruiformes Family: Rallidae

Rallidae is a large family of small to medium-sized birds which includes the rails, crakes, coots and gallinules. Typically they inhabit dense vegetation in damp environments near lakes, swamps, or rivers. In general they are shy and secretive birds, making them difficult to observe. Most species have strong legs and long toes which are well adapted to soft uneven surfaces. They tend to have short, rounded wings and to be weak fliers. Twenty-three species have been recorded in Paraguay.

- Purple gallinule, Porphyrio martinica
- Azure gallinule, Porphyrio flavirostris
- Russet-crowned crake, Anurolimnas viridis
- Rufous-sided crake, Laterallus melanophaius
- Gray-breasted crake, Laterallus exilis
- Red-and-white crake, Laterallus leucopyrrhus
- Rufous-faced crake, Laterallus xenopterus
- Speckled rail, Coturnicops notatus
- Ocellated crake, Micropygia schomburgkii
- Ash-throated crake, Mustelirallus albicollis
- Paint-billed crake, Mustelirallus erythrops
- Spotted rail, Pardirallus maculatus
- Blackish rail, Pardirallus nigricans
- Plumbeous rail, Pardirallus sanguinolentus
- Giant wood-rail, Aramides ypecaha
- Gray-cowled wood-rail, Aramides cajaneus
- Slaty-breasted wood-rail, Aramides saracura
- Spot-flanked gallinule, Porphyriops melanops
- Yellow-breasted crake, Hapalocrex flaviventer
- Common gallinule, Gallinula galeata
- Red-fronted coot, Fulica rufifrons (V)
- Red-gartered coot, Fulica armillata
- White-winged coot, Fulica leucoptera

== Cranes ==
Order: Gruiformes Family: Gruidae

Cranes are large, long-legged and long-necked birds. Unlike the similar-looking but unrelated herons, cranes fly with necks outstretched, not pulled back. Most have elaborate and noisy courting displays or "dances". One species has been recorded in Paraguay.

- Common crane, Grus grus (V)

== Finfoots ==
Order: Gruiformes Family: Heliornithidae

Heliornithidae is a small family of tropical birds with webbed lobes on their feet similar to those of grebes and coots. One species has been recorded in Paraguay.

- Sungrebe, Heliornis fulica

== Plovers ==
Order: Charadriiformes Family: Charadriidae

The family Charadriidae includes the plovers, dotterels and lapwings. They are small to medium-sized birds with compact bodies, short, thick necks, and long, usually pointed, wings. They are found in open country worldwide, mostly in habitats near water. Seven species which have been recorded in Paraguay.

- Black-bellied plover, Pluvialis squatarola
- American golden-plover, Pluvialis dominica
- Pied lapwing, Hoploxypterus cayanus
- Rufous-chested dotterel, Zonibyx modestus (V)
- Semipalmated plover, Charadrius semipalmatus (V)
- Southern lapwing, Vanellus chilensis
- Collared plover, Anarynchus collaris

== Avocets and stilts ==
Order: Charadriiformes Family: Recurvirostridae

Recurvirostridae is a family of large wading birds, which includes the avocets and stilts. The avocets have long legs and long up-curved bills. The stilts have extremely long legs and long, thin, straight bills. One species has been recorded in Paraguay.

- Black-necked stilt, Himantopus melanurus

== Sandpipers ==
Order: Charadriiformes Family: Scolopacidae

Scolopacidae is a large diverse family of small to medium-sized shorebirds including the sandpipers, curlews, godwits, shanks, tattlers, woodcocks, snipes, dowitchers, and phalaropes. The majority of these species eat small invertebrates picked out of the mud or soil. Variation in length of legs and bills enables multiple species to feed in the same habitat, particularly on the coast, without direct competition for food. Twenty-three species have been recorded in Paraguay.

- Upland sandpiper, Bartramia longicauda
- Eskimo curlew, Numenius borealis (believed extinct)
- Hudsonian godwit, Limosa haemastica
- Ruddy turnstone, Arenaria interpres (V)
- Red knot, Calidris canutus
- Stilt sandpiper, Calidris himantopus
- Sanderling, Calidris alba
- Dunlin, Calidris alpina (V)
- Baird's sandpiper, Calidris bairdii
- Least sandpiper, Calidris minutilla (V)
- White-rumped sandpiper, Calidris fuscicollis
- Buff-breasted sandpiper, Calidris subruficollis
- Pectoral sandpiper, Calidris melanotos
- Semipalmated sandpiper, Calidris pusilla (U)
- Short-billed dowitcher, Limnodromus griseus (U)
- Giant snipe, Gallinago undulata
- Pantanal snipe, Gallinago paraguaiae
- Wilson's phalarope, Phalaropus tricolor
- Red phalarope, Phalaropus fulicarius (V)
- Spotted sandpiper, Actitis macularius
- Solitary sandpiper, Tringa solitaria
- Greater yellowlegs, Tringa melanoleuca
- Lesser yellowlegs, Tringa flavipes

== Jacanas ==
Order: Charadriiformes Family: Jacanidae

The jacanas are a group of waders which are found throughout the tropics. They are identifiable by their huge feet and claws which enable them to walk on floating vegetation in the shallow lakes that are their preferred habitat. One species has been recorded in Paraguay.

- Wattled jacana, Jacana jacana

== Painted-snipes ==
Order: Charadriiformes Family: Rostratulidae

Painted-snipes are short-legged, long-billed birds similar in shape to the true snipes, but more brightly colored. One species has been recorded in Paraguay.

- South American painted-snipe, Rostratula semicollaris

== Gulls ==
Order: Charadriiformes Family: Laridae

Laridae is a family of medium to large seabirds and includes gulls, kittiwakes, terns, and skimmers. Gulls are typically gray or white, often with black markings on the head or wings. They have longish bills and webbed feet. Terns are a group of generally medium to large seabirds typically with gray or white plumage, often with black markings on the head. Most terns hunt fish by diving but some pick insects off the surface of fresh water. Terns are generally long-lived birds, with several species known to live in excess of 30 years. Thirteen species of Laridae have been recorded in Paraguay.

- Black skimmer, Rynchops niger
- Brown-hooded gull, Chroicocephalus maculipennis (V)
- Gray-hooded gull, Chroicocephalus cirrocephalus
- Laughing gull, Leucophaeus atricilla (V)
- Franklin's gull, Leucophaeus pipixcan (V)
- Yellow-billed tern, Sternula superciliaris
- Large-billed tern, Phaetusa simplex
- Gull-billed tern, Gelochelidon nilotica (V)
- Whiskered tern, Chlidonias hybrida (V)
- Common tern, Sterna hirundo (V)
- Arctic tern, Sterna paradisaea (V)
- Snowy-crowned tern, Sterna trudeaui (U)
- Royal tern, Thalasseus maximus (U)

== Storks ==
Order: Ciconiiformes Family: Ciconiidae

Storks are large, long-legged, long-necked, wading birds with long, stout bills. Storks are mute, but bill-clattering is an important mode of communication at the nest. Their nests can be large and may be reused for many years. Many species are migratory. Three species have been recorded in Paraguay.

- Maguari stork, Ciconia maguari
- Jabiru, Jabiru mycteria
- Wood stork, Mycteria americana

== Anhingas ==
Order: Suliformes Family: Anhingidae

Anhingas are often called "snake-birds" because of their long thin neck, which gives a snake-like appearance when they swim with their bodies submerged. The males have black and dark-brown plumage, an erectile crest on the nape, and a larger bill than the female. The females have much paler plumage especially on the neck and underparts. The darters have completely webbed feet and their legs are short and set far back on the body. Their plumage is somewhat permeable, like that of cormorants, and they spread their wings to dry after diving. One species has been recorded in Paraguay.

- Anhinga, Anhinga anhinga

== Cormorants ==
Order: Suliformes Family: Phalacrocoracidae

Phalacrocoracidae is a family of medium to large coastal, fish-eating seabirds that includes cormorants and shags. Plumage colouration varies, with the majority having mainly dark plumage, some species being black-and-white and a few being colorful. One species has been recorded in Paraguay.

- Neotropic cormorant, Phalacrocorax brasilianus

== Herons ==
Order: Pelecaniformes Family: Ardeidae

The family Ardeidae contains the bitterns, herons and egrets. Herons and egrets are medium to large wading birds with long necks and legs. Bitterns tend to be shorter necked and more wary. Members of Ardeidae fly with their necks retracted, unlike other long-necked birds such as storks, ibises and spoonbills. Fourteen species have been recorded in Paraguay.

- Rufescent tiger-heron, Tigrisoma lineatum
- Boat-billed heron, Cochlearius cochlearius
- Stripe-backed bittern, Ixobrychus involucris
- Least bittern, Ixobrychus exilis
- Pinnated bittern, Botaurus pinnatus
- Capped heron, Pilherodius pileatus
- Whistling heron, Syrigma sibilatrix
- Little blue heron, Egretta caerulea (V)
- Snowy egret, Egretta thula
- Black-crowned night-heron, Nycticorax nycticorax
- Striated heron, Butorides striata
- Cattle egret, Ardea ibis
- Great egret, Ardea alba
- Cocoi heron, Ardea cocoi

== Ibises ==
Order: Pelecaniformes Family: Threskiornithidae

Threskiornithidae is a family of large terrestrial and wading birds which includes the ibises and spoonbills. They have long, broad wings with 11 primary and about 20 secondary feathers. They are strong fliers and despite their size and weight, very capable soarers. Six species have been recorded in Paraguay.

- White-faced ibis, Plegadis chihi
- Green ibis, Mesembrinibis cayennensis
- Bare-faced ibis, Phimosus infuscatus
- Plumbeous ibis, Theristicus caerulescens
- Buff-necked ibis, Theristicus caudatus
- Roseate spoonbill, Platalea ajaja

== New World vultures ==
Order: Cathartiformes Family: Cathartidae

The New World vultures are not closely related to Old World vultures, but superficially resemble them because of convergent evolution. Like the Old World vultures, they are scavengers. However, unlike Old World vultures, which find carcasses by sight, New World vultures have a good sense of smell with which they locate carrion. Five species have been recorded in Paraguay.

- King vulture, Sarcoramphus papa
- Andean condor, Vultur gryphus (U)
- Black vulture, Coragyps atratus
- Turkey vulture, Cathartes aura
- Lesser yellow-headed vulture, Cathartes burrovianus

== Osprey ==
Order: Accipitriformes Family: Pandionidae

The family Pandionidae contains only one species, the osprey. The osprey is a medium-large raptor which is a specialist fish-eater with a worldwide distribution.

- Osprey, Pandion haliaetus

== Hawks ==
Order: Accipitriformes Family: Accipitridae

Accipitriformes is an order of birds of prey, which includes hawks, eagles, kites, harriers (all Accipitridae), the osprey (Pandionidae), and New World vultures (Cathartidae). These birds have powerful hooked beaks for tearing flesh from their prey, strong legs, powerful talons, and keen eyesight. Thirty-five species of Accipitridae have been recorded in Paraguay.

- Pearl kite, Gampsonyx swainsonii
- White-tailed kite, Elanus leucurus
- Hook-billed kite, Chondrohierax uncinatus
- Gray-headed kite, Leptodon cayanensis
- Swallow-tailed kite, Elanoides forficatus
- Crested eagle, Morphnus guianensis
- Harpy eagle, Harpia harpyja
- Black hawk-eagle, Spizaetus tyrannus
- Black-and-white hawk-eagle, Spizaetus melanoleucus
- Ornate hawk-eagle, Spizaetus ornatus
- Black-collared hawk, Busarellus nigricollis
- Snail kite, Rostrhamus sociabilis
- Rufous-thighed kite, Harpagus diodon
- Mississippi kite, Ictinia mississippiensis
- Plumbeous kite, Ictinia plumbea
- Gray-bellied hawk, Accipiter poliogaster
- Sharp-shinned hawk, Accipiter striatus
- Bicolored hawk, Astur bicolor
- Cinereous harrier, Circus cinereus
- Long-winged harrier, Circus buffoni
- Tiny hawk, Microspizias superciliosus
- Crane hawk, Geranospiza caerulescens
- Savanna hawk, Buteogallus meridionalis
- Great black hawk, Buteogallus urubitinga
- Chaco eagle, Buteogallus coronatus
- Roadside hawk, Rupornis magnirostris
- Harris's hawk, Parabuteo unicinctus
- White-rumped hawk, Parabuteo leucorrhous
- White-tailed hawk, Geranoaetus albicaudatus
- Black-chested buzzard-eagle, Geranoaetus melanoleucus
- Mantled hawk, Pseudastur polionotus (extirpated)
- Gray-lined hawk, Buteo nitidus
- Short-tailed hawk, Buteo brachyurus
- Swainson's hawk, Buteo swainsoni
- Zone-tailed hawk, Buteo albonotatus

== Barn owls ==
Order: Strigiformes Family: Tytonidae

Barn owls are medium to large owls with large heads and characteristic heart-shaped faces. They have long strong legs with powerful talons. One species has been recorded in Paraguay.

- American barn owl, Tyto furcata

== Owls ==
Order: Strigiformes Family: Strigidae

The typical owls are small to large solitary nocturnal birds of prey. They have large forward-facing eyes and ears, a hawk-like beak, and a conspicuous circle of feathers around each eye called a facial disk. Sixteen species have been recorded in Paraguay.

- Tropical screech-owl, Megascops choliba
- Black-capped screech-owl, Megascops atricapilla
- Spectacled owl, Pulsatrix perspicillata
- Tawny-browed owl, Pulsatrix koeniswaldiana
- Tropical horned owl, Bubo nacurutu
- Rusty-barred owl, Strix hylophila
- Chaco owl, Strix chacoensis
- Mottled owl, Strix virgata
- Black-banded owl, Strix huhula
- Least pygmy-owl, Glaucidium minutissimum (U)
- Ferruginous pygmy-owl, Glaucidium brasilianum
- Burrowing owl, Athene cunicularia
- Buff-fronted owl, Aegolius harrisii
- Striped owl, Asio clamator
- Stygian owl, Asio stygius
- Short-eared owl, Asio flammeus

== Trogons ==
Order: Trogoniformes Family: Trogonidae

The family Trogonidae includes trogons and quetzals. Found in tropical woodlands worldwide, they feed on insects and fruit, and their broad bills and weak legs reflect their diet and arboreal habits. Although their flight is fast, they are reluctant to fly any distance. Trogons have soft, often colorful, feathers with distinctive male and female plumage. Three species have been recorded in Paraguay.

- Blue-crowned trogon, Trogon curucui
- Surucua trogon, Trogon surrucura
- Atlantic black-throated trogon, Trogon chrysochloros

== Motmots ==
Order: Coraciiformes Family: Momotidae

The motmots have colorful plumage and long, graduated tails which they display by waggling back and forth. In most of the species, the barbs near the ends of the two longest (central) tail feathers are weak and fall off, leaving a length of bare shaft and creating a racket-shaped tail. Two species have been recorded in Paraguay.

- Rufous-capped motmot, Baryphthengus ruficapillus
- Amazonian motmot, Momotus momota

== Kingfishers ==
Order: Coraciiformes Family: Alcedinidae

Kingfishers are medium-sized birds with large heads, long, pointed bills, short legs, and stubby tails. Five species have been recorded in Paraguay.

- Ringed kingfisher, Megaceryle torquata
- Amazon kingfisher, Chloroceryle amazona
- American pygmy kingfisher, Chloroceryle aenea
- Green kingfisher, Chloroceryle americana
- Green-and-rufous kingfisher, Chloroceryle inda

== Jacamars ==
Order: Galbuliformes Family: Galbulidae

The jacamars are near passerine birds from tropical South America, with a range that extends up to Mexico. They feed on insects caught on the wing, and are glossy, elegant birds with long bills and tails. In appearance and behavior they resemble the Old World bee-eaters, although they are more closely related to puffbirds. One species has been recorded in Paraguay.

- Rufous-tailed jacamar, Galbula ruficauda

== Puffbirds ==
Order: Galbuliformes Family: Bucconidae

The puffbirds are related to the jacamars and have the same range, but lack the iridescent colors of that family. They are mainly brown, rufous, or gray, with large heads and flattened bills with hooked tips. The loose abundant plumage and short tails makes them look stout and puffy, giving rise to the English common name of the family. Four species have been recorded in Paraguay.

- Buff-bellied puffbird, Notharchus swainsoni
- White-eared puffbird, Nystalus chacuru
- Spot-backed puffbird, Nystalus maculatus
- Rusty-breasted nunlet, Nonnula rubecula

== Toucans ==
Order: Piciformes Family: Ramphastidae

Toucans are near passerine birds from the Neotropics. They are brightly marked and have enormous colorful bills which in some species amount to half their body length. Five species have been recorded in Paraguay.

- Toco toucan, Ramphastos toco
- Red-breasted toucan, Ramphastos dicolorus
- Spot-billed toucanet, Selenidera maculirostris
- Saffron toucanet, Baillonius bailloni
- Chestnut-eared aracari, Pteroglossus castanotis

== Woodpeckers ==
Order: Piciformes Family: Picidae

Woodpeckers are small to medium-sized birds with chisel-like beaks, short legs, stiff tails, and long tongues used for capturing insects. Some species have feet with two toes pointing forward and two backward, while several species have only three toes. Many woodpeckers have the habit of tapping noisily on tree trunks with their beaks. Twenty-one species have been recorded in Paraguay.

- White-barred piculet, Picumnus cirratus
- Ochre-collared piculet, Picumnus temminckii
- White-wedged piculet, Picumnus albosquamatus
- White woodpecker, Melanerpes candidus
- Yellow-fronted woodpecker, Melanerpes flavifrons
- White-fronted woodpecker, Melanerpes cactorum
- White-spotted woodpecker, Dryobates spilogaster
- Checkered woodpecker, Dryobates mixtus
- Little woodpecker, Dryobates passerinus
- Robust woodpecker, Campephilus robustus
- Crimson-crested woodpecker, Campephilus melanoleucos
- Cream-backed woodpecker, Campephilus leucopogon
- Lineated woodpecker, Dryocopus lineatus
- Black-bodied woodpecker, Dryocopus schulzi
- Pale-crested woodpecker, Celeus lugubris
- Helmeted woodpecker, Celeus galeatus
- Blond-crested woodpecker, Celeus flavescens
- Golden-green woodpecker, Piculus chrysochloros
- White-browed woodpecker, Piculus aurulentus
- Green-barred woodpecker, Colaptes melanochloros
- Campo flicker, Colaptes campestris

== Seriemas ==
Order: Cariamiformes Family: Cariamidae

The seriemas are terrestrial birds which run rather than fly (though they are able to fly for short distances). They have long legs, necks and tails, but only short wings, reflecting their way of life. They are brownish birds with short bills and erectile crests, found on fairly-dry open grasslands. Both of the family's two species have been recorded in Paraguay.

- Red-legged seriema, Cariama cristata
- Black-legged seriema, Chunga burmeisteri

== Falcons ==
Order: Falconiformes Family: Falconidae

Falconidae is a family of diurnal birds of prey. They differ from hawks, eagles and kites in that they kill with their beaks instead of their talons. Twelve species have been recorded in Paraguay.

- Laughing falcon, Herpetotheres cachinnans
- Barred forest-falcon, Micrastur ruficollis
- Collared forest-falcon, Micrastur semitorquatus
- Spot-winged falconet, Spiziapteryx circumcincta
- Crested caracara, Caracara plancus
- Yellow-headed caracara, Milvago chimachima
- Chimango caracara, Milvago chimango
- American kestrel, Falco sparverius
- Bat falcon, Falco rufigularis
- Orange-breasted falcon, Falco deiroleucus
- Aplomado falcon, Falco femoralis
- Peregrine falcon, Falco peregrinus

== New World and African parrots ==
Order: Psittaciformes Family: Psittacidae

Parrots are small to large birds with a characteristic curved beak. Their upper mandibles have slight mobility in the joint with the skull and they have a generally erect stance. All parrots are zygodactyl, having the four toes on each foot placed two at the front and two to the back. Twenty-four species have been recorded in Paraguay.

- Monk parakeet, Myiopsitta monachus
- Yellow-chevroned parakeet, Brotogeris chiriri
- Pileated parrot, Pionopsitta pileata
- Scaly-headed parrot, Pionus maximiliani
- Yellow-faced parrot, Alipiopsitta xanthops
- Vinaceous-breasted amazon, Amazona vinacea
- Red-spectacled amazon, Amazona pretrei (U)
- Turquoise-fronted amazon, Amazona aestiva
- Orange-winged amazon, Amazona amazonica
- Cobalt-rumped parrotlet, Forpus xanthopterygius
- Blaze-winged parakeet, Pyrrhura devillei
- Maroon-bellied parakeet, Pyrrhura frontalis
- Green-cheeked parakeet, Pyrrhura molinae
- Hyacinth macaw, Anodorhynchus hyacinthinus
- Glaucous macaw, Anodorhynchus glaucus (possibly extinct)
- Peach-fronted parakeet, Eupsittula aurea
- Nanday parakeet, Aratinga nenday
- Golden-capped parakeet, Aratinga auricapillus (V)
- Blue-winged macaw, Primolius maracana
- Yellow-collared macaw, Primolius auricollis
- Blue-and-yellow macaw, Ara ararauna
- Red-and-green macaw, Ara chloropterus
- Blue-crowned parakeet, Thectocercus acuticaudatus
- White-eyed parakeet, Psittacara leucophthalmus

== Antbirds ==
Order: Passeriformes Family: Thamnophilidae

The antbirds are a large family of small passerine birds of subtropical and tropical Central and South America. They are forest birds which tend to feed on insects at or near the ground. A sizable minority of them specialize in following columns of army ants to eat small invertebrates that leave their hiding places to flee from the ants. Many species lack bright color; brown, black and white being the dominant tones. Twenty-two species have been recorded in Paraguay.

- Spot-backed antshrike, Hypoedaleus guttatus
- Giant antshrike, Batara cinerea
- Large-tailed antshrike, Mackenziaena leachii
- Tufted antshrike, Mackenziaena severa
- Great antshrike, Taraba major
- Barred antshrike, Thamnophilus doliatus
- Rufous-capped antshrike, Thamnophilus ruficapillus
- Rufous-winged antshrike, Thamnophilus torquatus
- Bolivian slaty-antshrike, Thamnophilus sticturus
- Variable antshrike, Thamnophilus caerulescens
- Plain antvireo, Dysithamnus mentalis
- Black-capped antwren, Herpsilochmus atricapillus
- Rusty-winged antwren, Herpsilochmus rufimarginatus
- Stripe-backed antbird, Myrmorchilus strigilatus
- Black-bellied antwren, Formicivora melanogaster
- Rusty-backed antwren, Formicivora rufa
- Bertoni's antbird, Drymophila rubricollis
- Dusky-tailed antbird, Drymophila malura
- Streak-capped antwren, Terenura maculata
- Mato Grosso antbird, Cercomacra melanaria
- Western fire-eye, Pyriglena maura
- White-shouldered fire-eye, Pyriglena leucoptera

== Crescentchests ==
Order: Passeriformes Family: Melanopareiidae

These are smallish birds which inhabit regions of arid scrub. They have a band across the chest which gives them their name.

- Collared crescentchest, Melanopareia torquata
- Olive-crowned crescentchest, Melanopareia maximiliani

== Gnateaters ==
Order: Passeriformes Family: Conopophagidae

The gnateaters are round, short-tailed and long-legged birds, which are closely related to the antbirds. One species has been recorded in Paraguay.

- Rufous gnateater, Conopophaga lineata

== Antpittas ==
Order: Passeriformes Family: Grallariidae

Antpittas resemble the true pittas with strong, longish legs, very short tails and stout bills. Two species have been recorded in Paraguay

- Variegated antpitta, Grallaria varia
- Speckle-breasted antpitta, Cryptopezus nattereri

== Tapaculos ==
Order: Passeriformes Family: Rhinocryptidae

The tapaculos are small suboscine passeriform birds with numerous species in South and Central America. They are terrestrial species that fly only poorly on their short wings. They have strong legs, well-suited to their habitat of grassland or forest undergrowth. The tail is cocked and pointed towards the head.

- Crested gallito, Rhinocrypta lanceolata

== Antthrushes ==
Order: Passeriformes Family: Formicariidae

Antthrushes resemble small rails. One species has been recorded in Paraguay.

- Short-tailed antthrush, Chamaeza campanisona

== Ovenbirds ==
Order: Passeriformes Family: Furnariidae

Ovenbirds comprise a large family of small sub-oscine passerine bird species found in Central and South America. They are a diverse group of insectivores which gets its name from the elaborate "oven-like" clay nests built by some species, although others build stick nests or nest in tunnels or clefts in rock. The woodcreepers are brownish birds which maintain an upright vertical posture, supported by their stiff tail vanes. They feed mainly on insects taken from tree trunks. Fifty-eight species have been recorded in Paraguay.

- Rufous-breasted leaftosser, Sclerurus scansor
- Campo miner, Geositta poeciloptera (V)
- Olivaceous woodcreeper, Sittasomus griseicapillus
- Plain-winged woodcreeper, Dendrocincla turdina
- Black-banded woodcreeper, Dendrocolaptes picumnus
- Planalto woodcreeper, Dendrocolaptes platyrostris
- White-throated woodcreeper, Xiphocolaptes albicollis
- Great rufous woodcreeper, Xiphocolaptes major
- Lesser woodcreeper, Xiphorhynchus fuscus
- Red-billed scythebill, Campylorhamphus trochilirostris
- Black-billed scythebill, Campylorhamphus falcularius
- Scimitar-billed woodcreeper, Drymornis bridgesii
- Narrow-billed woodcreeper, Lepidocolaptes angustirostris
- Scalloped woodcreeper, Lepidocolaptes falcinellus
- Atlantic plain-xenops, Xenops minutus
- Streaked xenops, Xenops rutilans
- Chaco earthcreeper, Tarphonomus certhioides
- Pale-legged hornero, Furnarius leucopus
- Rufous hornero, Furnarius rufus
- Crested hornero, Furnarius cristatus
- Sharp-tailed streamcreeper, Lochmias nematura
- Wren-like rushbird, Phleocryptes melanops
- Buff-winged cinclodes, Cinclodes fuscus (V)
- Sharp-billed treehunter, Heliobletus contaminatus
- Black-capped foliage-gleaner, Philydor atricapillus
- White-browed foliage-gleaner, Anabacerthia amaurotis (U)
- Ochre-breasted foliage-gleaner, Anabacerthia lichtensteini
- Buff-browed foliage-gleaner, Syndactyla rufosuperciliata
- Russet-mantled foliage-gleaner, Syndactyla dimidiata
- Buff-fronted foliage-gleaner, Dendroma rufa
- Chestnut-capped foliage-gleaner, Clibanornis rectirostris
- Canebrake groundcreeper, Clibanornis dendrocolaptoides
- White-eyed foliage-gleaner, Automolus leucophthalmus
- Tufted tit-spinetail, Leptasthenura platensis (V)
- Rufous-fronted thornbird, Phacellodomus rufifrons
- Little thornbird, Phacellodomus sibilatrix
- Freckle-breasted thornbird, Phacellodomus striaticollis (U)
- Greater thornbird, Phacellodomus ruber
- Firewood-gatherer, Anumbius annumbi
- Lark-like brushrunner, Coryphistera alaudina
- Short-billed canastero, Asthenes baeri
- Sharp-billed canastero, Asthenes pyrrholeuca
- Rusty-backed spinetail, Cranioleuca vulpina
- Stripe-crowned spinetail, Cranioleuca pyrrhophia
- Olive spinetail, Cranioleuca obsoleta
- Bay-capped wren-spinetail, Spartonoica maluroides
- Rufous cacholote, Pseudoseisura unirufa
- Brown cacholote, Pseudoseisura lophotes
- Yellow-chinned spinetail, Certhiaxis cinnamomeus
- Chotoy spinetail, Schoeniophylax phryganophilus
- Ochre-cheeked spinetail, Synallaxis scutata
- Gray-bellied spinetail, Synallaxis cinerascens
- White-lored spinetail, Synallaxis albilora
- Rufous-capped spinetail, Synallaxis ruficapilla
- Cinereous-breasted spinetail, Synallaxis hypospodia
- Spix's spinetail, Synallaxis spixi
- Pale-breasted spinetail, Synallaxis albescens
- Sooty-fronted spinetail, Synallaxis frontalis

== Manakins ==
Order: Passeriformes Family: Pipridae

The manakins are a family of subtropical and tropical mainland Central and South America, and Trinidad and Tobago. They are compact forest birds, the males typically being brightly colored, although the females of most species are duller and usually green-plumaged. Manakins feed on small fruits, berries and insects. Four species have been recorded in Paraguay.

- Helmeted manakin, Chiroxiphia galeata
- Swallow-tailed manakin, Chiroxiphia caudata
- White-bearded manakin, Manacus manacus
- Band-tailed manakin, Pipra fasciicauda

== Cotingas ==
Order: Passeriformes Family: Cotingidae

The cotingas are birds of forests or forest edges in tropical South America. Comparatively little is known about this diverse group, although all have broad bills with hooked tips, rounded wings and strong legs. The males of many of the species are brightly colored, or decorated with plumes or wattles. Four species have been recorded in Paraguay.

- White-tipped plantcutter, Phytotoma rutila
- Swallow-tailed cotinga, Phibalura flavirostris
- Red-ruffed fruitcrow, Pyroderus scutatus
- Bare-throated bellbird, Procnias nudicollis

== Tityras ==
Order: Passeriformes Family: Tityridae

Tityridae are suboscine passerine birds found in forest and woodland in the Neotropics. The species in this family were formerly spread over the families Tyrannidae, Pipridae, and Cotingidae. They are small to medium-sized birds. They do not have the sophisticated vocal capabilities of the songbirds. Most, but not all, have plain coloring. Nine species have been recorded in Paraguay.

- Black-crowned tityra, Tityra inquisitor
- Black-tailed tityra, Tityra cayana
- Masked tityra, Tityra semifasciata
- Greenish schiffornis, Schiffornis virescens
- White-naped xenopsaris, Xenopsaris albinucha
- Green-backed becard, Pachyramphus viridis
- Chestnut-crowned becard, Pachyramphus castaneus
- White-winged becard, Pachyramphus polychopterus
- Crested becard, Pachyramphus validus

== Sharpbill ==
Order: Passeriformes Family: Oxyruncidae

The sharpbill is a small bird of dense forests in Central and South America. It feeds mostly on fruit but also eats insects.

- Sharpbill, Oxyruncus cristatus

== Tyrant flycatchers ==
Order: Passeriformes Family: Tyrannidae

Tyrant flycatchers are passerine birds which occur throughout North and South America. They superficially resemble the Old World flycatchers, but are more robust and have stronger bills. They do not have the sophisticated vocal capabilities of the songbirds. Most, but not all, have plain coloring. As the name implies, most are insectivorous. One hundred species have been recorded in Paraguay.

- Wing-barred piprites, Piprites chloris
- White-throated spadebill, Platyrinchus mystaceus
- Russet-winged spadebill, Platyrinchus leucoryphus
- Southern antpipit, Corythopis delalandi
- Southern bristle-tyrant, Pogonotriccus eximius
- São Paulo bristle-tyrant, Pogonotriccus paulista
- Mottle-cheeked tyrannulet, Phylloscartes ventralis
- Bay-ringed tyrannulet, Phylloscartes sylviolus
- Gray-hooded flycatcher, Mionectes rufiventris
- Sepia-capped flycatcher, Leptopogon amaurocephalus
- Yellow-olive Flatbill, Tolmomyias sulphurescens
- Eared pygmy-tyrant, Myiornis auricularis
- Drab-breasted pygmy-tyrant, Hemitriccus diops
- Pearly-vented tody-tyrant, Hemitriccus margaritaceiventer
- Ochre-faced tody-flycatcher, Poecilotriccus plumbeiceps
- Rusty-fronted tody-flycatcher, Poecilotriccus latirostris
- Common tody-flycatcher, Todirostrum cinereum
- Cliff flycatcher, Hirundinea ferruginea
- Greater wagtail-tyrant, Stigmatura budytoides
- Plain tyrannulet, Inezia inornata
- Fulvous-crowned scrub-tyrant, Euscarthmus meloryphus
- Rufous-sided scrub-tyrant, Euscarthmus rufomarginatus
- Yellow-bellied elaenia, Elaenia flavogaster
- Large elaenia, Elaenia spectabilis
- White-crested elaenia, Elaenia albiceps
- Small-billed elaenia, Elaenia parvirostris
- Olivaceous elaenia, Elaenia mesoleuca
- Lesser elaenia, Elaenia chiriquensis
- Small-headed elaenia, Elaenia sordida
- Gray elaenia, Myiopagis caniceps
- Greenish elaenia, Myiopagis viridicata
- Suiriri flycatcher, Suiriri suiriri
- Yellow tyrannulet, Capsiempis flaveola
- Rough-legged tyrannulet, Phyllomyias burmeisteri
- Greenish tyrannulet, Phyllomyias virescens
- Reiser's tyrannulet, Phyllomyias reiseri
- Planalto tyrannulet, Phyllomyias fasciatus
- Southeastern beardless-tyrannulet, Camptostoma obsoletum
- Mouse-colored tyrannulet, Nesotriccus murinus
- Bearded tachuri, Polystictus pectoralis
- Sharp-tailed tyrant, Culicivora caudacuta
- Crested doradito, Pseudocolopteryx sclateri
- Subtropical doradito, Pseudocolopteryx acutipennis
- Dinelli's doradito, Pseudocolopteryx dinelliana
- Warbling doradito, Pseudocolopteryx flaviventris
- Ticking doradito, Pseudocolopteryx citreola (V)
- Sooty tyrannulet, Serpophaga nigricans
- White-crested tyrannulet, Serpophaga subcristata
- Straneck's tyrannulet, Serpophaga griseicapilla
- Rufous-tailed attila, Attila phoenicurus
- Piratic flycatcher, Legatus leucophaius
- Large-headed flatbill, Ramphotrigon megacephalum
- Great kiskadee, Pitangus sulphuratus
- Cattle tyrant, Machetornis rixosa
- Boat-billed flycatcher, Megarynchus pitangua
- Streaked flycatcher, Myiodynastes maculatus
- Rusty-margined flycatcher, Myiozetetes cayanensis
- Social flycatcher, Myiozetetes similis
- Three-striped flycatcher, Conopias trivirgatus
- Variegated flycatcher, Empidonomus varius
- Crowned slaty flycatcher, Empidonomus aurantioatrocristatus
- Tropical kingbird, Tyrannus melancholicus
- Fork-tailed flycatcher, Tyrannus savana
- Eastern kingbird, Tyrannus tyrannus
- Rufous casiornis, Casiornis rufus
- Sibilant sirystes, Sirystes sibilator
- Swainson's flycatcher, Myiarchus swainsoni
- Short-crested flycatcher, Myiarchus ferox
- Brown-crested flycatcher, Myiarchus tyrannulus
- Long-tailed tyrant, Colonia colonus
- Bran-colored flycatcher, Myiophobus fasciatus
- Southern scrub-flycatcher, Sublegatus modestus
- Vermilion flycatcher, Pyrocephalus rubinus
- Black-backed water-tyrant, Fluvicola albiventer
- Masked water tyrant, Fluvicola nengeta (V)
- White-headed marsh tyrant, Arundinicola leucocephala
- Streamer-tailed tyrant, Gubernetes yetapa
- Cock-tailed tyrant, Alectrurus tricolor
- Strange-tailed tyrant, Alectrurus risora
- Austral negrito, Lessonia rufa
- Spectacled tyrant, Hymenops perspicillatus
- Crested black-tyrant, Knipolegus lophotes
- Blue-billed black-tyrant, Knipolegus cyanirostris
- Cinereous tyrant, Knipolegus striaticeps
- White-winged black-tyrant, Knipolegus aterrimus
- Hudson's black-tyrant, Knipolegus hudsoni
- Yellow-browed tyrant, Satrapa icterophrys
- White-rumped monjita, Xolmis velatus
- White monjita, Xolmis irupero
- Gray monjita, Nengetus cinereus
- Black-crowned monjita, Neoxolmis coronatus
- Chocolate-vented tyrant, Neoxolmis rufiventris (U)
- Black-and-white monjita, Heteroxolmis dominicana (U)
- Gray-bellied shrike-tyrant, Agriornis micropterus
- Lesser shrike-tyrant, Agriornis murinus
- Fuscous flycatcher, Cnemotriccus fuscatus
- Euler's flycatcher, Lathrotriccus euleri
- Alder flycatcher, Empidonax alnorum
- Tropical pewee, Contopus cinereus
- Shear-tailed gray tyrant, Muscipipra vetula
- Many-colored rush tyrant, Tachuris rubrigastra

== Vireos ==
Order: Passeriformes Family: Vireonidae

The vireos are a group of small to medium-sized passerine birds. They are typically greenish in color and resemble wood warblers apart from their heavier bills. Three species have been recorded in Paraguay.

- Rufous-browed peppershrike, Cyclarhis gujanensis
- Rufous-crowned greenlet, Hylophilus poicilotis
- Chivi vireo, Vireo chivi

== Jays ==
Order: Passeriformes Family: Corvidae

The family Corvidae includes crows, ravens, jays, choughs, magpies, treepies, nutcrackers, and ground jays. Corvids are above average in size among the Passeriformes, and some of the larger species show high levels of intelligence. Three species have been recorded in Paraguay.

- Purplish jay, Cyanocorax cyanomelas
- Curl-crested jay, Cyanocorax cristatellus
- Plush-crested jay, Cyanocorax chrysops

== Swallows ==
Order: Passeriformes Family: Hirundinidae

The family Hirundinidae is adapted to aerial feeding. They have a slender streamlined body, long pointed wings and a short bill with a wide gape. The feet are adapted to perching rather than walking, and the front toes are partially joined at the base. Fourteen species have been recorded in Paraguay.

- Blue-and-white swallow, Pygochelidon cyanoleuca
- Black-collared swallow, Pygochelidon melanoleuca (U)
- Tawny-headed swallow, Alopochelidon fucata
- Southern rough-winged swallow, Stelgidopteryx ruficollis
- Brown-chested martin, Progne tapera
- Purple martin, Progne subis
- Gray-breasted martin, Progne chalybea
- Southern martin, Progne elegans
- White-winged swallow, Tachycineta albiventer
- White-rumped swallow, Tachycineta leucorrhoa
- Chilean swallow, Tachycineta leucopyga
- Bank swallow, Riparia riparia
- Barn swallow, Hirundo rustica
- Cliff swallow, Petrochelidon pyrrhonota

== Wrens ==
Order: Passeriformes Family: Troglodytidae

The wrens are mainly small and inconspicuous except for their loud songs. These birds have short wings and thin down-turned bills. Several species often hold their tails upright. All are insectivorous. Five species have been recorded in Paraguay.

- Southern house-wren, Troglodytes musculus
- Grass wren, Cistothorus platensis
- Thrush-like wren, Campylorhynchus turdinus
- Buff-breasted wren, Cantorchilus leucotis
- Fawn-breasted wren, Cantorchilus guarayanus

== Gnatcatchers ==
Order: Passeriformes Family: Polioptilidae

These dainty birds resemble Old World warblers in their build and habits, moving restlessly through the foliage seeking insects. The gnatcatchers and gnatwrens are mainly soft bluish gray in color and have the typical insectivore's long sharp bill. They are birds of fairly open woodland or scrub which nest in bushes or trees. Two species have been recorded in Paraguay.

- Creamy-bellied gnatcatcher, Polioptila lactea
- Masked gnatcatcher, Polioptila dumicola

== Donacobius ==
Order: Passeriformes Family: Donacobiidae

The black-capped donacobius is found in wet habitats from Panama across northern South America and east of the Andes to Argentina and Paraguay.

- Black-capped donacobius, Donacobius atricapilla

== Thrushes ==
Order: Passeriformes Family: Turdidae

The thrushes are a group of passerine birds that occur mainly in the Old World. They are plump, soft plumaged, small to medium-sized insectivores or sometimes omnivores, often feeding on the ground. Many have attractive songs. Seven species have been recorded in Paraguay.

- Veery, Catharus fuscescens (V)
- Yellow-legged thrush, Turdus flavipes (extirpated)
- Pale-breasted thrush, Turdus leucomelas
- Rufous-bellied thrush, Turdus rufiventris
- Creamy-bellied thrush, Turdus amaurochalinus
- Blacksmith thrush, Turdus subalaris
- Rufous-flanked thrush, Turdus albicollis

== Mockingbirds ==
Order: Passeriformes Family: Mimidae

The mimids are a family of passerine birds that includes thrashers, mockingbirds, tremblers, and the New World catbirds. These birds are notable for their vocalizations, especially their ability to mimic a wide variety of birds and other sounds heard outdoors. Their coloring tends towards dull-grays and browns. Two species have been recorded in Paraguay.

- Chalk-browed mockingbird, Mimus saturninus
- White-banded mockingbird, Mimus triurus

== Old World sparrows ==
Order: Passeriformes Family: Passeridae

Sparrows are small passerine birds. In general, sparrows tend to be small, plump, brown or gray birds with short tails and short powerful beaks. Sparrows are seed eaters, but they also consume small insects. One species has been recorded in Paraguay.

- House sparrow, Passer domesticus (I)

== Pipits and wagtails ==
Order: Passeriformes Family: Motacillidae

Motacillidae is a family of small passerine birds with medium to long tails. They include the wagtails, longclaws and pipits. They are slender, ground feeding insectivores of open country. Six species have been recorded in Paraguay.

- Yellowish pipit, Anthus chii
- Short-billed pipit, Anthus furcatus
- Pampas pipit, Anthus chacoensis
- Correndera pipit, Anthus correndera (V)
- Ochre-breasted pipit, Anthus nattereri
- Hellmayr's pipit, Anthus hellmayri

== Finches ==
Order: Passeriformes Family: Fringillidae

Finches are seed-eating passerine birds, that are small to moderately large and have a strong beak, usually conical and in some species very large. All have twelve tail feathers and nine primaries. These birds have a bouncing flight with alternating bouts of flapping and gliding on closed wings, and most sing well. Seven species have been recorded in Paraguay.

- Hooded siskin, Spinus magellanica
- Golden-rumped euphonia, Chlorophonia cyanocephala
- Blue-naped chlorophonia, Chlorophonia cyanea
- Purple-throated euphonia, Euphonia chlorotica
- Green-throated euphonia, Euphonia chalybea
- Violaceous euphonia, Euphonia violacea
- Chestnut-bellied euphonia, Euphonia pectoralis

== Sparrows ==
Order: Passeriformes Family: Passerellidae

Most of the species are known as sparrows, but these birds are not closely related to the Old World sparrows which are in the family Passeridae. Many of these have distinctive head patterns. Four species have been recorded in Paraguay.

- Chaco sparrow, Rhynchospiza strigiceps
- Grassland sparrow, Ammodramus humeralis
- Saffron-billed sparrow, Arremon flavirostris
- Rufous-collared sparrow, Zonotrichia capensis

== Blackbirds ==
Order: Passeriformes Family: Icteridae

The icterids are a group of small to medium-sized, often colorful, passerine birds restricted to the New World and include the grackles, New World blackbirds, and New World orioles. Most species have black as the predominant plumage color, often enlivened by yellow, orange, or red. Twenty species have been recorded in Paraguay.

- Bobolink, Dolichonyx oryzivorus
- White-browed meadowlark, Leistes superciliaris
- Crested oropendola, Psarocolius decumanus
- Solitary black cacique, Cacicus solitarius
- Golden-winged cacique, Cacicus chrysopterus
- Red-rumped cacique, Cacicus haemorrhous
- Orange-backed troupial, Icterus croconotus
- Variable oriole, Icterus pyrrhopterus
- Screaming cowbird, Molothrus rufoaxillaris
- Giant cowbird, Molothrus oryzivorus
- Shiny cowbird, Molothrus bonariensis
- Scarlet-headed blackbird, Amblyramphus holosericeus
- Chopi blackbird, Gnorimopsar chopi
- Grayish baywing, Agelaioides badius
- Unicolored blackbird, Agelasticus cyanopus
- Yellow-winged blackbird, Agelasticus thilius (V)
- Chestnut-capped blackbird, Chrysomus ruficapillus
- Saffron-cowled blackbird, Xanthopsar flavus
- Yellow-rumped marshbird, Pseudoleistes guirahuro
- Brown-and-yellow marshbird, Pseudoleistes virescens (V)

== Wood-warblers ==
Order: Passeriformes Family: Parulidae

The wood-warblers are a group of small, often colorful, passerine birds restricted to the New World. Most are arboreal, but some are terrestrial. Most members of this family are insectivores. Six species have been recorded in Paraguay.

- Masked yellowthroat, Geothlypis aequinoctialis
- Tropical parula, Parula pitiayumi
- Flavescent warbler, Myiothlypis flaveola
- White-browed warbler, Myiothlypis leucoblephara
- Riverbank warbler, Myiothlypis rivularis
- Golden-crowned warbler, Basileuterus culicivorus

== Cardinal grosbeaks ==
Order: Passeriformes Family: Cardinalidae

The cardinals are a family of robust, seed-eating birds with strong bills. They are typically associated with open woodland. The sexes usually have distinct plumages. Six species have been recorded in Paraguay.

- Hepatic tanager, Piranga flava
- Red-crowned ant-tanager, Habia rubica
- Black-backed grosbeak, Pheucticus aureoventris
- Blackish-blue seedeater, Amaurospiza moesta
- Glaucous-blue grosbeak, Cyanoloxia glaucocaerulea
- Ultramarine grosbeak, Cyanoloxia brissonii

== Tanagers ==
Order: Passeriformes Family: Thraupidae

The tanagers are a large group of small to medium-sized passerine birds restricted to the New World, mainly in the tropics. Many species are brightly colored. As a family they are omnivorous, but individual species specialize in eating fruits, seeds, insects, or other types of food. Most have short, rounded wings. Seventy-one species have been recorded in Paraguay.

- Hooded tanager, Nemosia pileata
- Guira tanager, Hemithraupis guira
- Chestnut-vented conebill, Conirostrum speciosum
- Saffron finch, Sicalis flaveola
- Grassland yellow-finch, Sicalis luteola
- Uniform finch, Haplospiza unicolor
- Blue-black grassquit, Volatinia jacarina
- Ruby-crowned tanager, Tachyphonus coronatus
- White-lined tanager, Tachyphonus rufus
- Gray-headed tanager, Eucometis penicillata
- Black-goggled tanager, Trichothraupis melanops
- Red-crested finch, Coryphospingus cucullatus
- Silver-beaked tanager, Ramphocelus carbo
- Swallow tanager, Tersina viridis
- Blue dacnis, Dacnis cayana
- Lined seedeater, Sporophila lineola
- White-bellied seedeater, Sporophila leucoptera
- Copper seedeater, Sporophila bouvreuil
- Pearly-bellied seedeater, Sporophila pileata
- Tawny-bellied seedeater, Sporophila hypoxantha
- Ibera seedeater, Sporophila iberaensis
- Dark-throated seedeater, Sporophila ruficollis
- Marsh seedeater, Sporophila palustris
- Rufous-rumped seedeater, Sporophila hypochroma
- Chestnut seedeater, Sporophila cinnamomea
- Chestnut-bellied seed-finch, Sporophila angolensis
- Yellow-bellied seedeater, Sporophila nigricollis (U)
- Double-collared seedeater, Sporophila caerulescens
- Temminck's seedeater, Sporophila falcirostris
- Buffy-fronted seedeater, Sporophila frontalis (U)
- Plumbeous seedeater, Sporophila plumbea
- Rusty-collared seedeater, Sporophila collaris
- Many-colored chaco finch, Saltatricula multicolor
- Black-throated saltator, Saltatricula atricollis
- Bluish-gray saltator, Saltator coerulescens
- Green-winged saltator, Saltator similis
- Golden-billed saltator, Saltator aurantiirostris
- Black-throated grosbeak, Saltator fuliginosus
- Black-masked finch, Coryphaspiza melanotis
- Great Pampa-finch, Embernagra platensis
- Wedge-tailed grass-finch, Emberizoides herbicola
- Lesser grass-finch, Emberizoides ypiranganus
- Black-and-rufous warbling finch, Poospiza nigrorufa
- Orange-headed tanager, Thlypopsis sordida
- Chestnut-headed tanager, Thlypopsis pyrrhocoma
- Gray-throated warbling finch, Microspingus cabanisi (V)
- Ringed warbling-finch, Microspingus torquatus
- Black-capped warbling finch, Microspingus melanoleucus
- White-rumped tanager, Cypsnagra hirundinacea
- Long-tailed reed finch, Donacospiza albifrons
- Bananaquit, Coereba flaveola
- Dull-colored grassquit, Asemospiza obscura
- Sooty grassquit, Asemospiza fuliginosa
- Black-crested finch, Lophospingus pusillus
- White-banded tanager, Neothraupis fasciata
- Diuca finch, Diuca diuca (U)
- Yellow cardinal, Gubernatrix cristata (U)
- Red-crested cardinal, Paroaria coronata
- Yellow-billed cardinal, Paroaria capitata
- Diademed tanager, Stephanophorus diadematus (V)
- Black-faced tanager, Schistochlamys melanopis (V)
- Cinnamon tanager, Schistochlamys ruficapillus (V)
- Magpie tanager, Cissopis leverianus
- Fawn-breasted tanager, Pipraeidea melanonota
- Blue-and-yellow tanager, Rauenia bonariensis
- Chestnut-backed tanager, Stilpnia preciosa (V)
- Burnished-buff tanager, Stilpnia cayana
- Green-headed tanager, Tangara seledon
- Red-necked tanager, Tangara cyanocephala (U)
- Sayaca tanager, Thraupis sayaca
- Palm tanager, Thraupis palmarum

== See also ==
- List of birds
- Lists of birds by region
