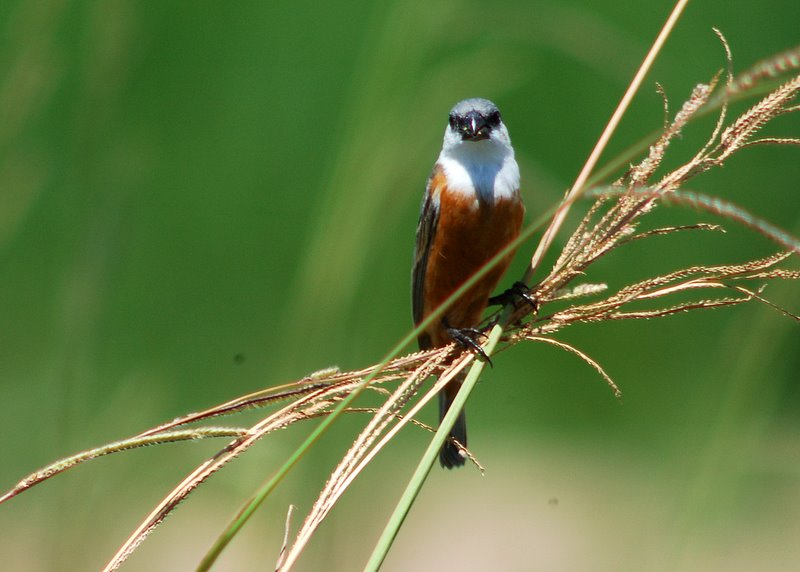
- Male

Conservation status
- Endangered (IUCN 3.1)

Scientific classification
- Kingdom: Animalia
- Phylum: Chordata
- Class: Aves
- Order: Passeriformes
- Family: Thraupidae
- Genus: Sporophila
- Species: S. palustris

Binomial name
- Sporophila palustris (Barrows, 1883)
- Non-Breeding Breeding Migration

= Marsh seedeater =

Species of bird

The marsh seedeater (Sporophila palustris) is an Endangered species of bird in the family Thraupidae, the tanagers and allies. It is found in Argentina, Brazil, Paraguay, and Uruguay.

== Taxonomy and systematics ==
The marsh seedeater has a somewhat complicated taxonomic history. It was formally described in 1883 with the binomial Spermophila palustris. The genus was in the family Fringillidae. By 1938 it had been reclassified as Sporophila palustris, still in the family Fringillidae. By 1970 the genus Sporophila had been reassigned to the family Emberizidae. Based on studies published between 1988 and 2011, beginning in 2012 Sporophila was moved to the tanager family Thraupidae.

A bird initially described as a new species, Sporophila zelichi (variously called Entre Ríos, white-collared, Zelich's, or Narosky's seedeater), opened a controversy. Subsequent authors treated it as a species, as a color morph of the chestnut seedeater (S. cinnamomea), as a color morph of the marsh seedeater, or as a hybrid between the chestnut and marsh seedeaters. A study published in 2008 eliminated three of those hypotheses based on vocalization and habitat comparisons. The author proposed that S. zelichi is a color morph of the marsh seedeater, and the next year taxonomic systems began merging it into S. palustris.

The marsh seedeater is monotypic.

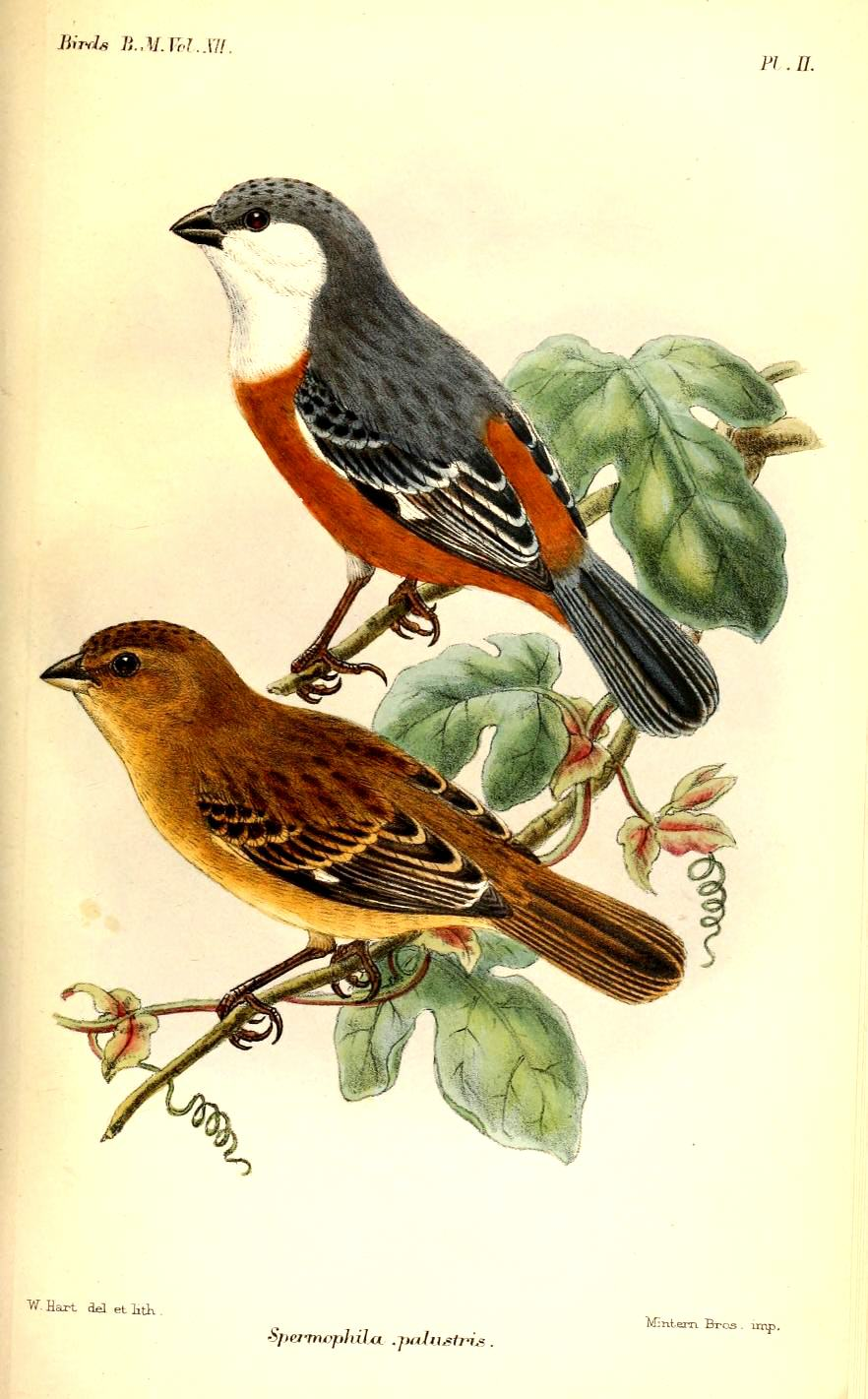
Marsh seedeater by W. M. Hart

== Description ==
The marsh seedeater is about 10.5 to 11.5 cm (4.1 to 4.5 in) long; one male weighed 9 g (0.32 oz) and one female 7.5 g (0.26 oz). It is one of the smallest of its genus. It has a smallish bill with a rounded culmen. The species is sexually dimorphic. Adult males have a plumbeous gray crown to just below the eye; the rest of their head is white. Their nape and back are plumbeous gray and their rump dark brown to cinnamon. Their tail is blackish. Their wings are blackish with gray or brown feather edges and the primaries have white bases that show as a patch on the folded wing. Their throat and breast are white and the rest of their underparts dark brown to cinnamon. Females have a brownish head and back, sometimes with an olive cast. Their tail and wings are darker grayish brown. Their underparts are shades of ochraceous. Both sexes have a black iris and black legs. Males have a black bill; females have a brown maxilla and a pale yellowish mandible. Juveniles resemble adult females.

== Distribution and habitat ==
The marsh seedeater is found from extreme northern Buenos Aires Province in Argentina and extreme eastern Uruguay north through eastern Paraguay and southern Brazil to southern Mato Grosso and central Bahia. In the breeding season it inhabits tall, moist grasslands in and near marshes, and in the non-breeding season the drier grasslands of the Cerrado. In elevation it ranges from sea level to 1,100 m (3,600 ft).

== Behavior ==
=== Movement ===
The marsh seedeater is a nearly complete migrant. It breeds along the Argentina-Uruguay border, eastern Uruguay, part of the Argentina-Brazil border, and locally in far southern Brazil. After the breeding season most migrate in a broad front to south-central Brazil north of an approximate line from west-central Mato Grosso do Sul east to extreme eastern São Paulo state and far southern Minas Gerais. Some apparently remain in or near the breeding areas year-round. Its migration timing appears to be tied to the availability of grass seed.

=== Feeding ===
The marsh seedeater feeds on grass seeds, especially those of native grasses. It typically feeds while clinging to stems, sometimes upside down as the stem bends. In the breeding season it forages in pairs or family groups and outside it in larger groups that include other seed-eating species.

=== Breeding ===
The marsh seedeater breeds between November and February with a peak of activity in December and January. It nests on the edges of marshes, often in permanently flooded meadows. The female builds the nest, a cup made from grasses and spider web attached to several grass or herbaceous plant stalks. Most are less than 1 m (3.5 ft) above the ground. The clutch is two or three eggs that are light gray or light blue with brown and gray spots. In captivity incubation is for 11 to 12 days and hatching occurs 10 to 12 days after hatch. The female alone incubates and both parents provision nestlings.

=== Vocalization ===
The marsh seedeater's song is "sweet, melodious, and pleasant, composed largely of sweet descending whistles and with a distinctive note that rises in pitch before falling, tweeew tri tweew teee tweééoooo twip tweew tweew teee tweééooo twip...". Its usual call is "a sweet descending whistle, twéeeeeww" and it also makes a tslit call.

== Status ==
The IUCN originally in 1988 assessed the marsh seedeater as Threatened and since 1994 as Endangered. It has a small breeding range and its estimated population of 2000 to 3000 mature individuals is believed to be decreasing. "Heavy trapping pressure has extirpated the species from parts of Argentina and threatens populations in the río Uruguay basin...Habitat continues to be lost and degraded due to overgrazing, agriculture, afforestation, mining and fire." "The urgency of conservation efforts is underscored by the main threat of the replacement of native grassland and other vegetation with exotic pine (Pinus spp.) and eucalypt (Eucalyptus spp.) plantations...Similarly, some seasonally flooded grasslands and marshes, e.g., in southern Paraguay and parts of Uruguay, have been converted to rice fields." It is known to breed in a few protected areas.
