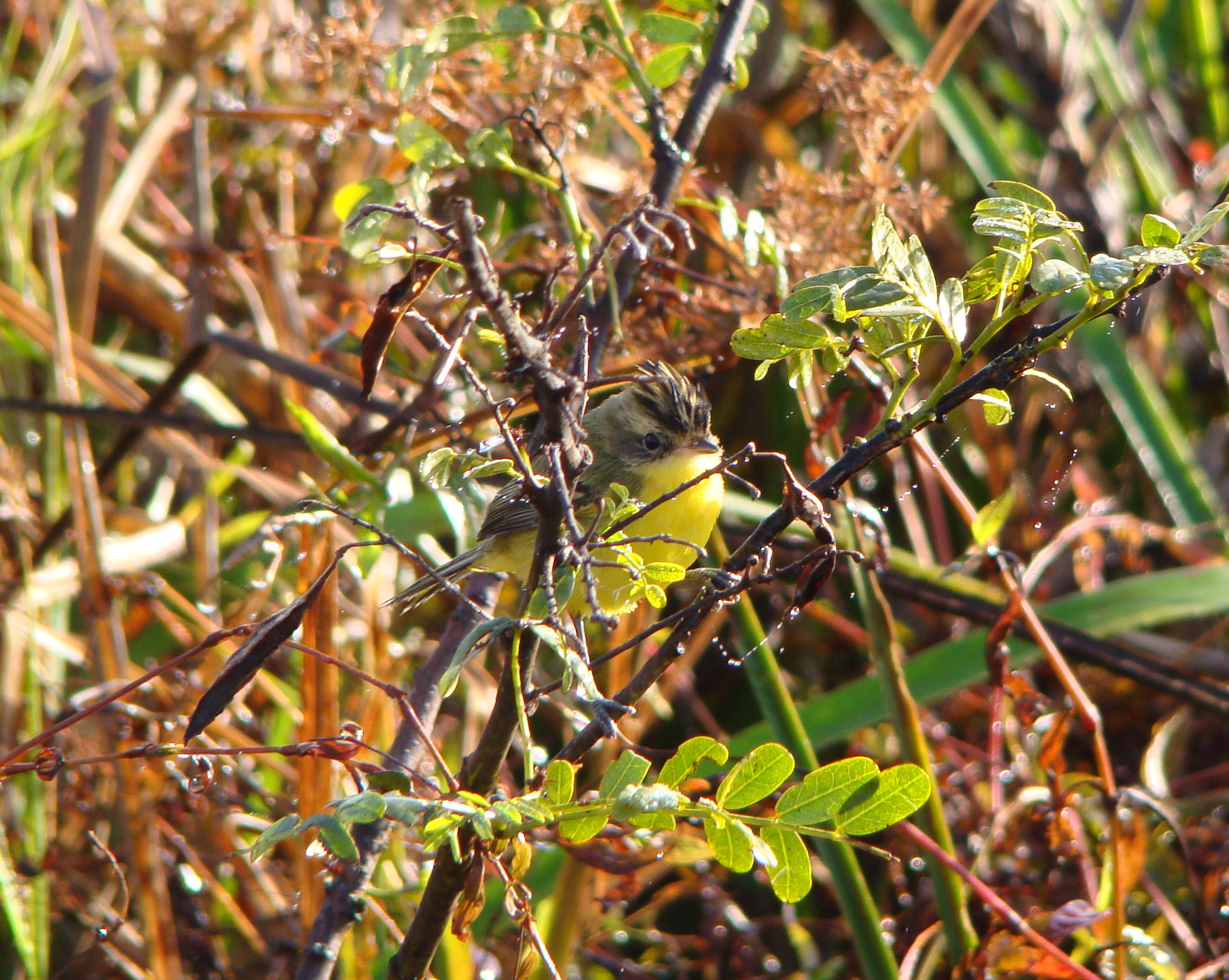
- Crested doradito (Pseudocolopteryx sclateri)

Scientific classification
- Kingdom: Animalia
- Phylum: Chordata
- Class: Aves
- Order: Passeriformes
- Family: Tyrannidae
- Genus: Pseudocolopteryx; Lillo, 1905

Type species
- Pseudocolopteryx dinellianus Lillo, 1905

Species
- see text

= Pseudocolopteryx =

Genus of birds

Pseudocolopteryx is a genus of bird in the family Tyrannidae. They are found in marshy habitats in South America. All have yellow underparts.

== Species ==
The genus contains five species:

Image	Common name	Scientific name	Distribution
	Crested doradito	Pseudocolopteryx sclateri	sparse rangle across South America and Trinidad and Tobago although more present in the Pantanal and Bahia forests.
	Subtropical doradito	Pseudocolopteryx acutipennis	Andes, Paraguay and northern Argentina.
	Dinelli's doradito	Pseudocolopteryx dinelliana	northern Argentina; winters to Bolivia and Paraguay.
	Warbling doradito	Pseudocolopteryx flaviventris	Argentina, Uruguay and South Region; winters to Paraguay.
	Ticking doradito	Pseudocolopteryx citreola	central Chile and western Argentina; winters to Bolivia.
