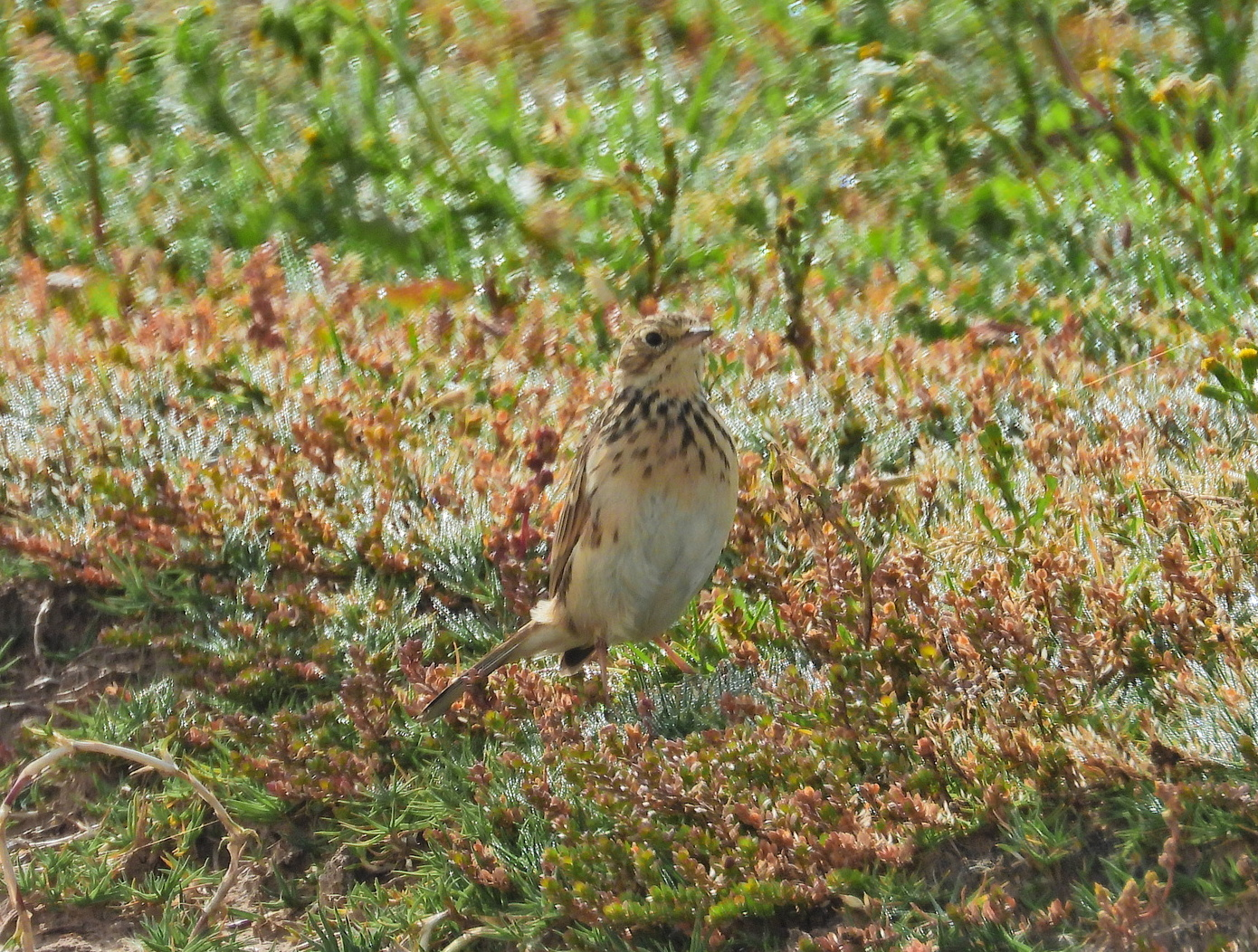

Conservation status
- Least Concern (IUCN 3.1)

Scientific classification
- Kingdom: Animalia
- Phylum: Chordata
- Class: Aves
- Order: Passeriformes
- Family: Motacillidae
- Genus: Anthus
- Species: A. brevirostris

Binomial name
- Anthus brevirostris Taczanowski, 1875

Synonyms
- Anthus furcatus brevirostris

= Puna pipit =

Species of bird

The puna pipit (Anthus brevirostris) is a species of bird in the family Motacillidae, the wagtails and pipits. It is found in Argentina, Bolivia, and Peru.

== Taxonomy and systematics ==
The puna pipit was described in 1875 with the binomial Anthus brevirostris. However, it was later reclassified as a subspecies of the short-billed pipit (A. furcatus). Following a study published in 2018 most taxonomic systems reclassified it as a full species. The independent South American Classification Committee retains the puna pipit as a subspecies of the short-billed.

The puna pipit is monotypic.

== Description ==
The puna pipit is about 14 cm (5.5 in) long and weighs about 20 g (0.71 oz). The sexes have the same plumage. Adults have a blackish brown head with a buffy-white supercilium, a buffy-white eye-ring, and a black "moustache". Their upperparts are blackish brown with buffy brown feather edges that give a scaled appearance. Their wings are dusky with buffy edges on the flight feathers and the coverts; the last show as two indistinct wing bars. Their tail is mostly dusky with white outer two pairs of feathers. Their throat and underparts are whitish with a strong buffy cast on the breast and flanks and dark streaks across the upper breast. They have a brown iris, a dark bill, and pinkish buff legs and feet.

== Distribution and habitat ==
The puna pipit is found intermittently in southern Peru south from southern Ancash and southwestern Huánuco departments. Its range continues south through western Bolivia. Some sources state that its range continues south into far northern Argentina, central Argentina, or simply Argentina. Others do not include Argentina in the species' range.

The puna pipit is a bird of the puna grasslands, a biome characterized by bunch grass, short grass, and shrubs. It also occurs in other grasslands and in pastures. Overall in elevation it ranges between 3,500 and 4,300 m (11,500 and 14,100 ft) but in Peru ranges between 3,500 and 4,100 m (11,500 and 13,500 ft).

== Behavior ==
=== Social behavior ===
The puna pipit is seen singly and in pairs during the breeding season and outside it forms flocks.

=== Movement ===
The puna pipit's movements are not well understood. It is thought to make local movements after the breeding season and possibly makes elevational movements.

=== Feeding ===
The puna pipit's diet has not been studied but is known to include insects and other invertebrates and is thought to also include seeds. It forages while walking and running on the ground.

=== Breeding ===
Male puna pipits make a flight display. Nothing else is known about the species' breeding biology.

=== Vocalization ===
The puna pipit sings during the flight display. Its song is "a series of reedy introductory notes followed by a musical gurling trill: chi-chi-eewww-wwwCHEWCHEWCHEW" and its call is "a flat clep".

== Status ==
The IUCN has assessed the puna pipit as being of Least Concern. Its population size is not known but is believed to be stable. No immediate threats have been identified. It is "described variously as fairly common [as in Peru] and as uncommon to locally common".
