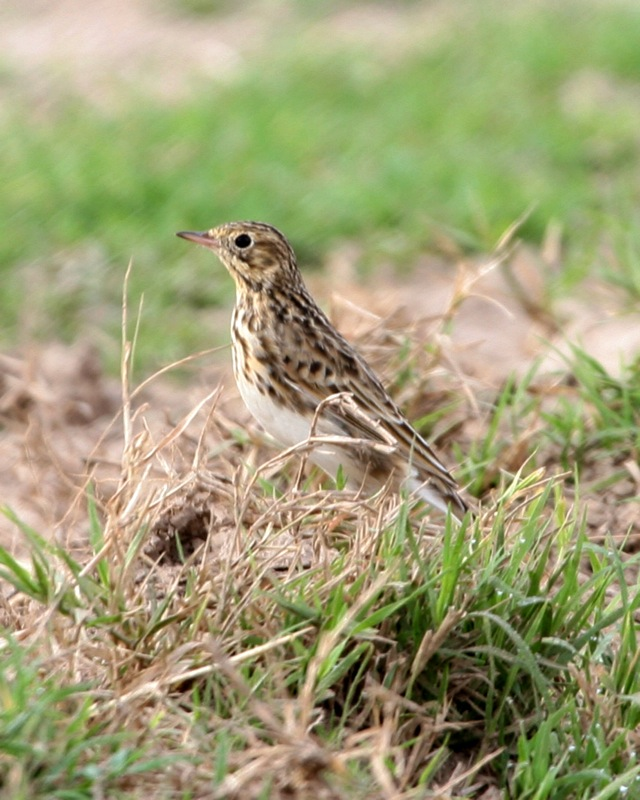

Conservation status
- Least Concern (IUCN 3.1)

Scientific classification
- Kingdom: Animalia
- Phylum: Chordata
- Class: Aves
- Order: Passeriformes
- Family: Motacillidae
- Genus: Anthus
- Species: A. furcatus

Binomial name
- Anthus furcatus Lafresnaye & d'Orbigny, 1837

= Short-billed pipit =

Species of bird

The short-billed pipit (Anthus furcatus) is a species of bird in the family Motacillidae, the wagtails and pipits. It is found in Argentina, Brazil, Paraguay and Uruguay.

== Taxonomy and systematics ==
The short-billed pipit was described in 1837 with the binomial Anthus furcatus, and has retained that name ever since.

Most taxonomic systems treat the short-billed pipit as monotypic. They formerly included what is now the puna pipit (A. brevirostrus) as a subspecies but separated them following a study published in 2018. However, the independent South American Classification Committee retains the puna pipit as a subspecies of the short-billed.

== Description ==
The short-billed pipit is 14 to 14.5 cm (5.5 to 5.7 in) long and weighs about 20 g (0.71 oz). The sexes have the same plumage. Adults have a blackish brown head with a whitish supercilium, a whitish eye-ring, and a black "moustache". Their upperparts are blackish brown with buffy brown feather edges that give a scaled appearance. Their wings are dusky with thin white edges on the primaries, buffy edges on the secondaries and tertials, and buffy edges on the coverts that show as two wing bars. Their tail is mostly dusky with much white on the outer two pairs of feathers. Their throat and underparts are whitish with a strong ochraceous cast on the breast and flanks and blackish streaks across the upper breast. They have a brown iris, a dark bill, and pinkish buff legs and feet. Juveniles have wide creamy feather edges on their upperparts.

== Distribution and habitat ==
The short-billed pipit is found in Rio Grande do Sul in extreme southern Brazil, southern Paraguay, and south through Uruguay and northern Argentina from Tucumán Province south to northern Chubut Province. It inhabits temperate grasslands.

== Behavior ==
=== Social behavior ===
The short-billed pipit is seen singly and in pairs during the breeding season and outside it forms flocks.

=== Movement ===
The short-billed pipit's movements are not well understood. It is thought to make local movements after the breeding season and is known in Paraguay only in the non-breeding season.

=== Feeding ===
The short-billed pipit's diet has not been studied but is known to include insects and other invertebrates and is thought to also include seeds. It forages while walking and running on the ground.

=== Breeding ===
The short-billed pipit's breeding season has not been determined but appears to span September to December in Argentina and extend to February in Brazil. Males make a flight display that may reach 80 m (260 ft) above the ground and last almost an hour. The species makes a hidden cup nest on the ground from grass and lined with finer fibers. The clutch is usually three or four eggs and two clutches might be laid in a season. The female alone apparently incubates, for a period of 12 to 13 days. Fledging occurs 12 to 13 days after hatch.

=== Vocalization ===
The short-billed pipit sings during its display flight, "an introductory broad-spectrum drawn-out buzz or rasp, followed by two short series of rapidly repeated musical notes: gleeeeeeeu-teedeleh-tleetleetlee or variation".

== Status ==
The IUCN has assessed the short-billed pipit as being of Least Concern. Its population size is not known but is believed to be stable. No immediate threats have been identified.
