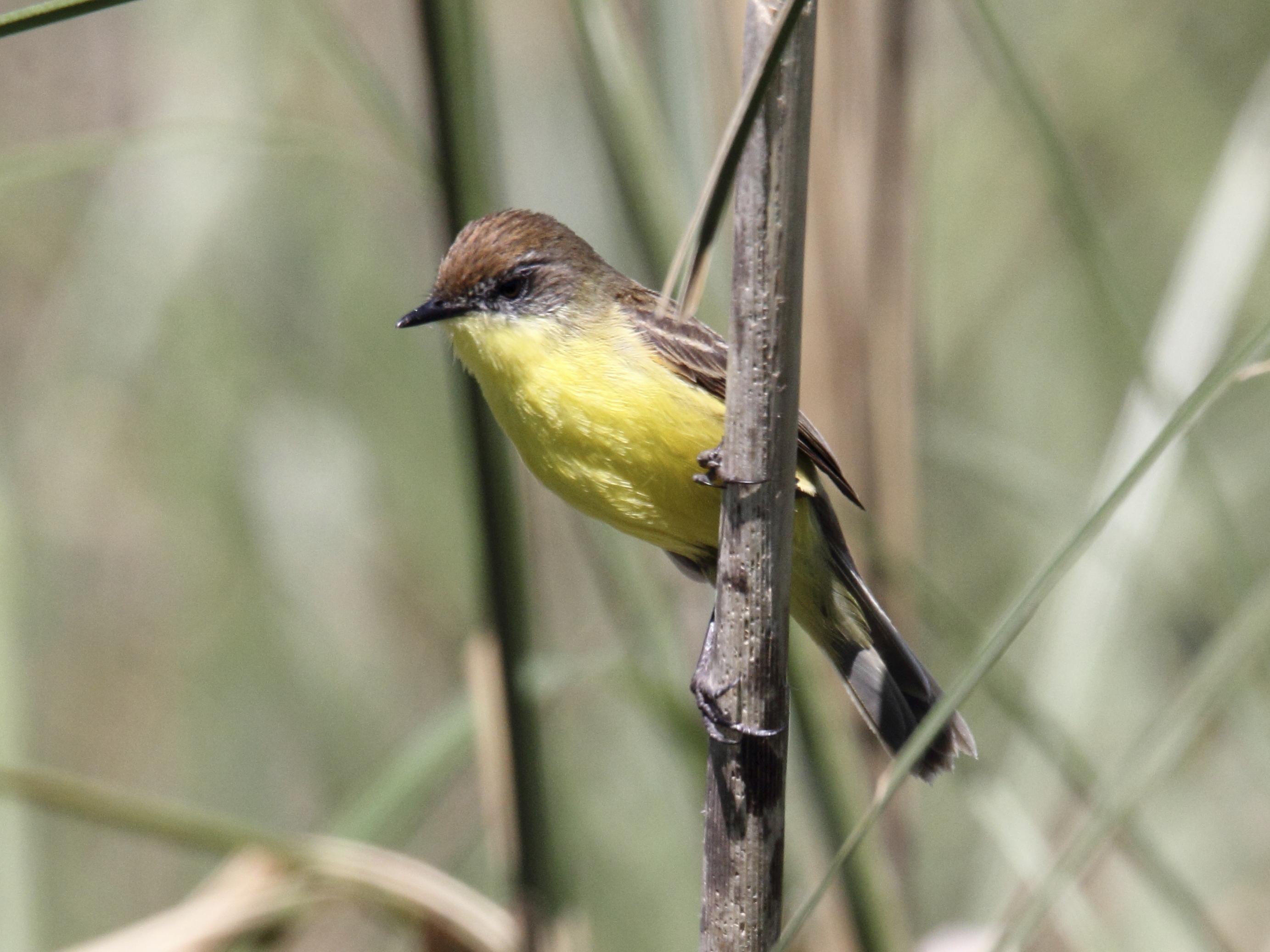

Conservation status
- Least Concern (IUCN 3.1)

Scientific classification
- Kingdom: Animalia
- Phylum: Chordata
- Class: Aves
- Order: Passeriformes
- Family: Tyrannidae
- Genus: Pseudocolopteryx
- Species: P. flaviventris

Binomial name
- Pseudocolopteryx flaviventris (d'Orbigny & Lafresnaye, 1837)

= Warbling doradito =

Species of bird

The warbling doradito (Pseudocolopteryx flaviventris) is a species of bird in subfamily Elaeniinae of family Tyrannidae, the tyrant flycatchers. It is found in Argentina, Paraguay, Uruguay and Brazil.

== Taxonomy and systematics ==
The warbling doradito is monotypic. However, what is now the ticking doradito (P. citreola) was previously included within it without being recognized as a subspecies. Taxonomic systems began separating them in 2010 based primarily on vocal differences.

== Description ==
The warbling doradito is 11 to 12 cm (4.3 to 4.7 in) long and weighs 7 to 8 g (0.25 to 0.28 oz). The sexes have the same plumage. Adults have a mostly dull olive-brown head and upperparts. Their crown is rufescent, their lores and cheeks are dusky, and their tail is dusky olive-brown. Their wings are dull olive-brown with light buffy edges on the flight feathers and tips on the wing coverts; the last show as two faint wing bars. Their throat is bright yellow and their underparts a slightly less bright yellow. Both sexes have a medium brown iris and dark gray legs and feet. Males have a slender, black, warbler-like bill; females have a mostly black bill with a pale pinkish base to the mandible. Juveniles are duller overall than adults; their wing bars are a deeper buffy, their throat grayer, their breast bright buffy, and their belly creamy yellow.

== Distribution and habitat ==
The warbling doradito is found from central Paraguay south to Buenos Aires Province in Argentina and east through Uruguay and in southern Brazil's Santa Catarina and Rio Grande do Sul states. It primarily inhabits reedbeds, freshwater and sawgrass marshes, and riparian vegetation. In the non-breeding season it also occurs in somewhat dryer grassy areas. In elevation it ranges between sea level and 500 m (1,600 ft).

== Behavior ==
=== Movement ===
The warbling doradito breeds in Argentina south of Santiago del Estero, central Santa Fe, and southern Corrientes provinces, throughout Uruguay, and in at least part of far southern Brazil. Following breeding the southmost populations move north into northern Argentina, part of southern Brazil, and central Paraguay. However, its exact movements, especially in Uruguay, Paraguay, and Brazil, are imperfectly known.

=== Feeding ===
The warbling doradito's diet has not been detailed but is known to be primarily insects. It forages singly or in small family groups, typically low and deep in the vegetation. It takes prey mostly by gleaning while perched and occasionally with short flights to hover-glean.

=== Breeding ===
The warbling doradito breeds between September and January. Its nest is cup woven from thin plant fibers and attached to vertical marsh vegetation. The clutch is two to four eggs that are creamy yellow. In a study in Argentina the incubation period averaged 17 days and the time to fledging averaged 13 days.

=== Vocalization ===
The warbling doradito's song is a "series of gentle and somewhat disjointed-sounding, high-pitched, staccato and squeaky notes, mechanical introduction followed by set of 4–8 more musical notes, 'chek, chek, chek, chek-chick-chick-chiquetik' or 'tk tk tk tk tk quít tuk péét tk-tuk, tk-quít' ", It makes "a 'tek' call while foraging".

== Status ==
The IUCN has assessed the warbling doradito as being of Least Concern. It has a large range; its population size is not known and is believed to be decreasing. No immediate threats have been identified. It is considered uncommon to locally fairly common and occurs in several protected areas.
