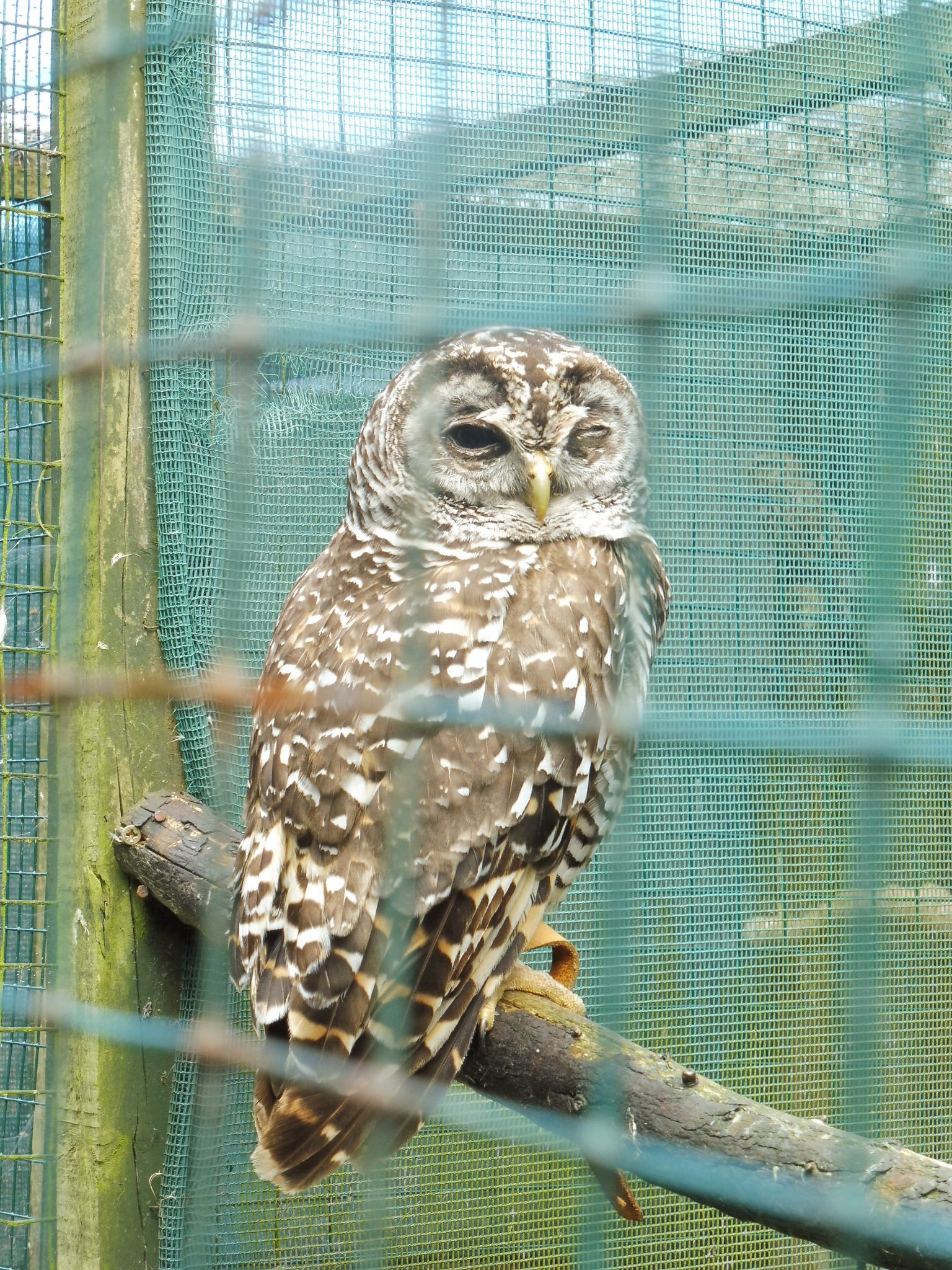
- Bodafon Farm Park, Llandudno (Wales)

Conservation status
- Near Threatened (IUCN 3.1)
- CITES Appendix II (CITES)

Scientific classification
- Kingdom: Animalia
- Phylum: Chordata
- Class: Aves
- Order: Strigiformes
- Family: Strigidae
- Genus: Strix
- Species: S. chacoensis

Binomial name
- Strix chacoensis Cherrie & Reichenberger, 1921

= Chaco owl =

Species of owl

The Chaco owl (Strix chacoensis) is an owl found in Argentina, Bolivia, and Paraguay.

== Taxonomy and systematics ==
The Chaco owl was originally described as a species, then quickly reclassified as a subspecies of rufous-legged owl (Strix rufipes). A 1995 paper provided strong morphological and vocal evidence that the original treatment as a species in its own right was correct. Later work showed that it is probably more closely related to the rusty-barred owl (S. hylophila) than to the rufous-legged. It is monotypic.

== Description ==
The Chaco owl is 35 to 38 cm (14 to 15 in) long. Males weigh 360 to 435 g (12.7 to 15.3 oz) and females 420 to 500 g (15 to 18 oz). It has a round head with no ear tufts. Adults have a pale grayish white facial disk with concentric dark lines. Their upperparts are dusky brownish black with narrow white and yellowish buff barring. Their underparts are off-white with dark brown barring. The tail is dark grayish brown with narrow pale bars.

== Distribution and habitat ==
The Chaco owl is found in southern South America, from Bolivia's Santa Cruz Department south through western Paraguay into north-central Argentina as far as Córdoba and Buenos Aires provinces. Its elevational range is not well known, but in Argentina it is found between 500 and 1,300 m (1,600 and 4,300 ft). It inhabits the Gran Chaco, a biome characterized by low rainfall. The species is found there in hilly, rolling, and flat terrain with a wide variety of forest types, both dense and semi-open.

== Behavior ==
=== Feeding ===
The Chaco owl is primarily nocturnal but is vocally active at dawn and dusk. It hunts from a perch, dropping on or flying to small mammals, birds, reptiles, and invertebrates.

=== Breeding ===
The Chaco owl's breeding phenology is poorly known but is assumed to be similar to that of other Strix owls. It probably nests in tree cavities or possibly holes in the ground. Captive females lay two to three eggs.

=== Vocalization ===
The male Chaco owl's song is a "rather frog-like crococro craorr-craorr craorr-craorr, with emphasis on the first craorr". The female's song is similar but higher pitched.

== Status ==
The IUCN originally assessed the Chaco owl as being of Least Concern but uprated it to Near Threatened in 2018. Its population size is not known but "is declining due to forest loss throughout its range."

== Additional reading ==
- König, Weick and Becking. 1999. "Owls: A Guide to the Owls of the World". Yale University Press
