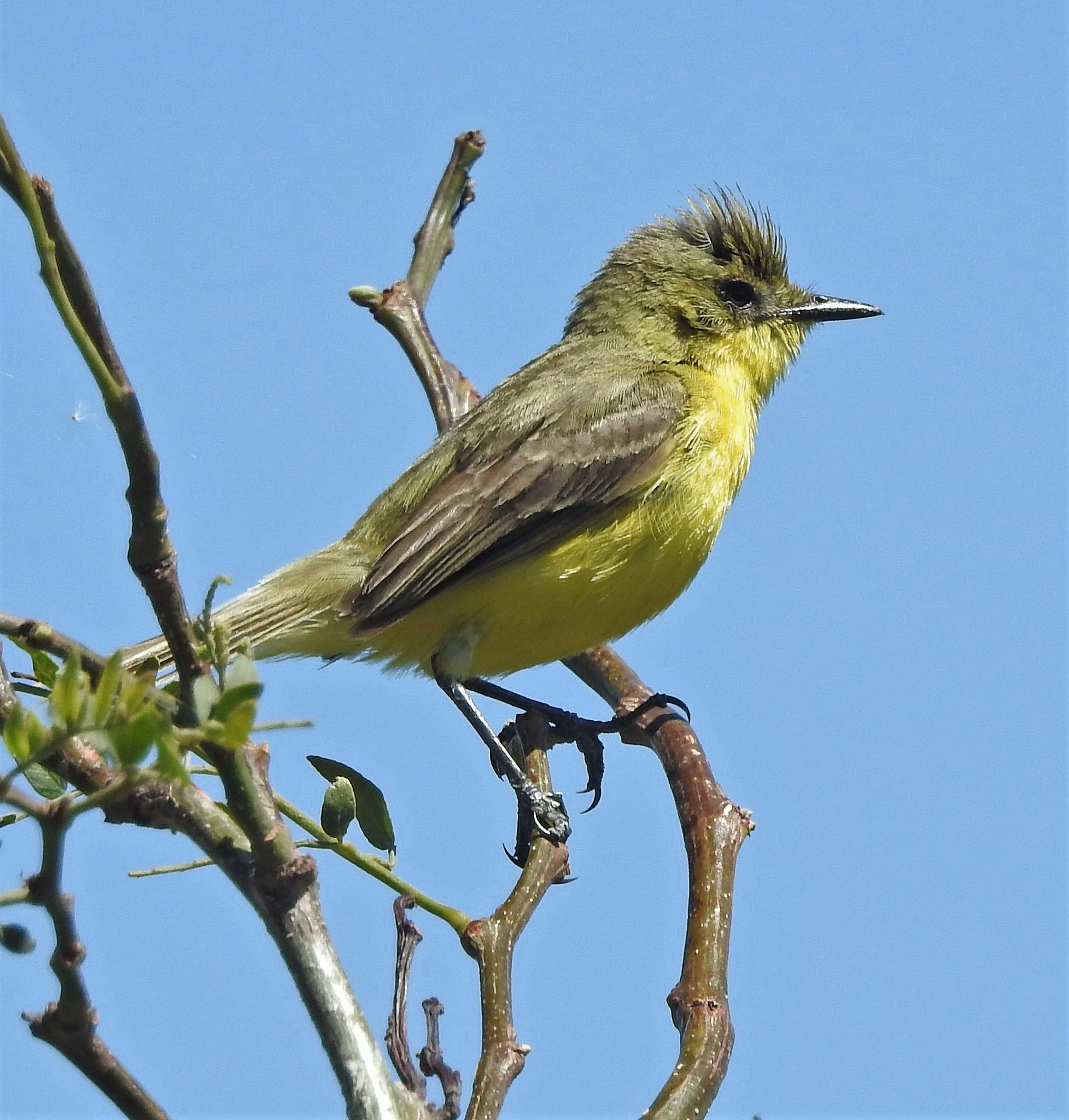

Conservation status
- Least Concern (IUCN 3.1)

Scientific classification
- Kingdom: Animalia
- Phylum: Chordata
- Class: Aves
- Order: Passeriformes
- Family: Tyrannidae
- Genus: Pseudocolopteryx
- Species: P. acutipennis

Binomial name
- Pseudocolopteryx acutipennis (Sclater, PL & Salvin, 1873)
- Year-round Non-Breeding

= Subtropical doradito =

Species of bird

The subtropical doradito (Pseudocolopteryx acutipennis) is a species of bird in subfamily Elaeniinae of family Tyrannidae, the tyrant flycatchers. It is found in Argentina, Bolivia, Brazil, Colombia, Ecuador, Paraguay, and Peru.

== Taxonomy and systematics ==
The subtropical doradito is monotypic. However, it has been suggested that more than one species may be present within it.

== Description ==
The subtropical doradito is 11 to 12 cm (4.3 to 4.7 in) long and weighs 7 to 10 g (0.25 to 0.35 oz). Both sexes have a short shaggy crest, and both have the same plumage. Adults have a mostly bright olive head, upperparts, and tail; their cheeks are dusky. Their wings are olive-brown with light gray edges on the flight feathers and dull cinnamon tips on the wing coverts; the last show as two faint wing bars. Their throat and underparts are golden-yellow. Both sexes have a dark brown iris, a slender, black, warbler-like bill, and dark gray legs and feet. Immatures are similar to adults but with more prominent buffy wing bars and a pale base to the mandible.

== Distribution and habitat ==
The subtropical doradito has a disjunct distribution. It is found in Colombia's Central Andes, in the central Andean valley of Ecuador between Imbambura and Chimborazo provinces, locally in Peru's central Andes, and from Peru's southern Andes south through central Bolivia, western Paraguay, and southern Brazil into northwestern Argentina. It primarily inhabits reedbeds, marshes, wet pastures and fields with sedges, and brushy areas near water. It also occurs in grassy areas that have few sedges. In elevation it ranges between 1,500 and 2,800 m (4,900 and 9,200 ft) in Colombia, between 2,400 and 3,500 m (7,900 and 11,500 ft) in Ecuador, between 1,400 and 3,200 m (4,600 and 10,500 ft) in central Peru, below 1,000 m (3,300 ft) in southern Peru, and below 700 m (2,300 ft) in Brazil.

== Behavior ==
=== Movement ===
The subtropical doradito is found year-round along the Andes. At least part of the populations from central Peru south move east into the Amazonian lowlands in the non-breeding season; some of the southernmost also move north in the Andes. The species occurs in Brazil only in the non-breeding season.

=== Feeding ===
The subtropical doradito feeds on insects. It forages singly or in small family groups, typically low in the vegetation but sometimes at its tips. It takes prey by gleaning while perched and with short flights to hover-glean.

=== Breeding ===
The subtropical doradito breeds between December and April in Bolivia; its season elsewhere is not known. Its nest is a deep cup made of grass and other plant fibers with a feather lining built in marsh vegetation. The clutch is three eggs; the incubation period, time to fledging, and details of parental care are not known.

=== Vocalization ===
The subtropical doraditos' song is described as "tzit-tzit-tzit t-konk followed by a wing-whir" and its call while foraging is a single "tzit".

== Status ==
The IUCN has assessed the subtropical doradito as being of Least Concern. It has a large range; its population size is not known and is believed to be decreasing. No immediate threats have been identified. It is considered rare in Colombia and Ecuador. It is a local breeder and rare austral migrant in Peru. One author considers it a vagrant in Brazil. It is considered fairly common in Argentina.
