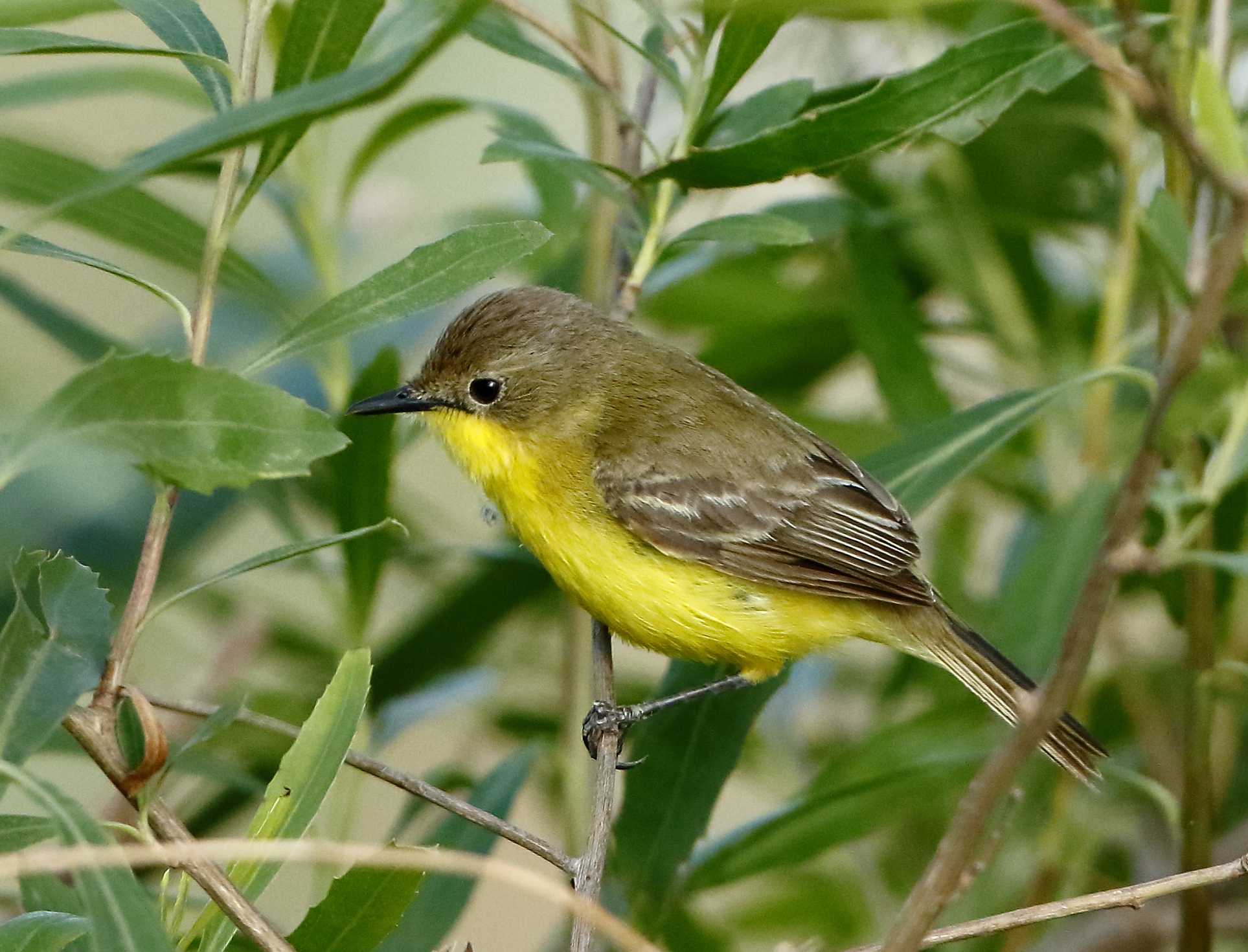
- At Huanqueros, Santa Fe, Argentina.

Conservation status
- Near Threatened (IUCN 3.1)

Scientific classification
- Kingdom: Animalia
- Phylum: Chordata
- Class: Aves
- Order: Passeriformes
- Family: Tyrannidae
- Genus: Pseudocolopteryx
- Species: P. dinelliana

Binomial name
- Pseudocolopteryx dinelliana Lillo, 1905

= Dinelli's doradito =

Species of bird

Dinelli's doradito (Pseudocolopteryx dinelliana) is a Near Threatened species of bird in subfamily Elaeniinae of family Tyrannidae, the tyrant flycatchers. It is found in Argentina, Bolivia, Paraguay, and possibly Brazil.

== Taxonomy and systematics ==
Dinelli's doradito is monotypic.

The species' common name and specific epithet commemorate the Argentinian biologist Luis Dinelli.

== Description ==
Dinelli's doradito is about 11 cm (4.3 in) long. The sexes have essentially the same plumage though females are duller than males. Adults have a mostly yellowish olive head whose crown, lores, and cheeks have a rufescent tinge. Their upperparts are yellowish olive. Their wings are a grayer olive, with thin buff edges on the flight feathers and wing coverts; the last show as two faint wing bars. Their tail is a brower olive. Males' throat and underparts are bright yellow; females' are duller yellow. Both sexes have a dark brown iris, a slender, black, warbler-like bill, and blackish gray legs and feet.

== Distribution and habitat ==
Dinelli's doradito is found from north-central Argentina's Córdoba north into western Paraguay and slightly into southern Bolivia. The South American Classification Committee of the American Ornithological Society has unconfirmed sight records in southern Brazil and therefore lists the species as hypothetical in that country. The species inhabits beds of reeds, grassy marshes, and shrublands near water. In elevation it reaches only 500 m (1,600 ft) above sea level.

== Behavior ==
=== Movement ===
Dinelli's doradito breeds in Argentina's Córdoba, Santiago del Estero, and, at least formerly, Tucumán provinces. It migrates north for the austral winter into northern Argentina, western Paraguay, southern Bolivia, and possibly southern Brazil. It might be a year-round resident in the most northerly part of its breeding range.

=== Feeding ===
The diet of Dinelli's doradito has not been detailed but is known to include insects and spiders. It forages in dense marsh vegetation.

=== Breeding ===
Dinelli's doradito breeds between September and April. Its nest is a deep cup made of plant fibers and spider egg cases attached to marsh grasses and sedges or in a fork of a shrub's branch in the marsh. The clutch is three eggs. The incubation period, time to fledging, and details of parental care are not known.

=== Vocalization ===
The song of Dinelli's doradito is a "[s]oft but twangy 'redek-redek-redidek', or 'zeik-zeik' ".

== Status ==
The IUCN originally in 1994 assessed Dinelli's doradito as Vulnerable and since 2004 as Near Threatened. It is rare to locally common in its somewhat limited range and its estimated population of between 6700 and 20,000 mature individuals is believed to be decreasing. "Canalisation may affect the wetlands of Bañados del Río Dulce and Laguna de Mar Chiquita, and there are other modifications to wetlands occurring within its range. Where it inhabits drier savanna-type vegetation, it is under some pressure from agricultural conversion, particularly for cattle ranching." It does occur in a few public and privately protected areas.
