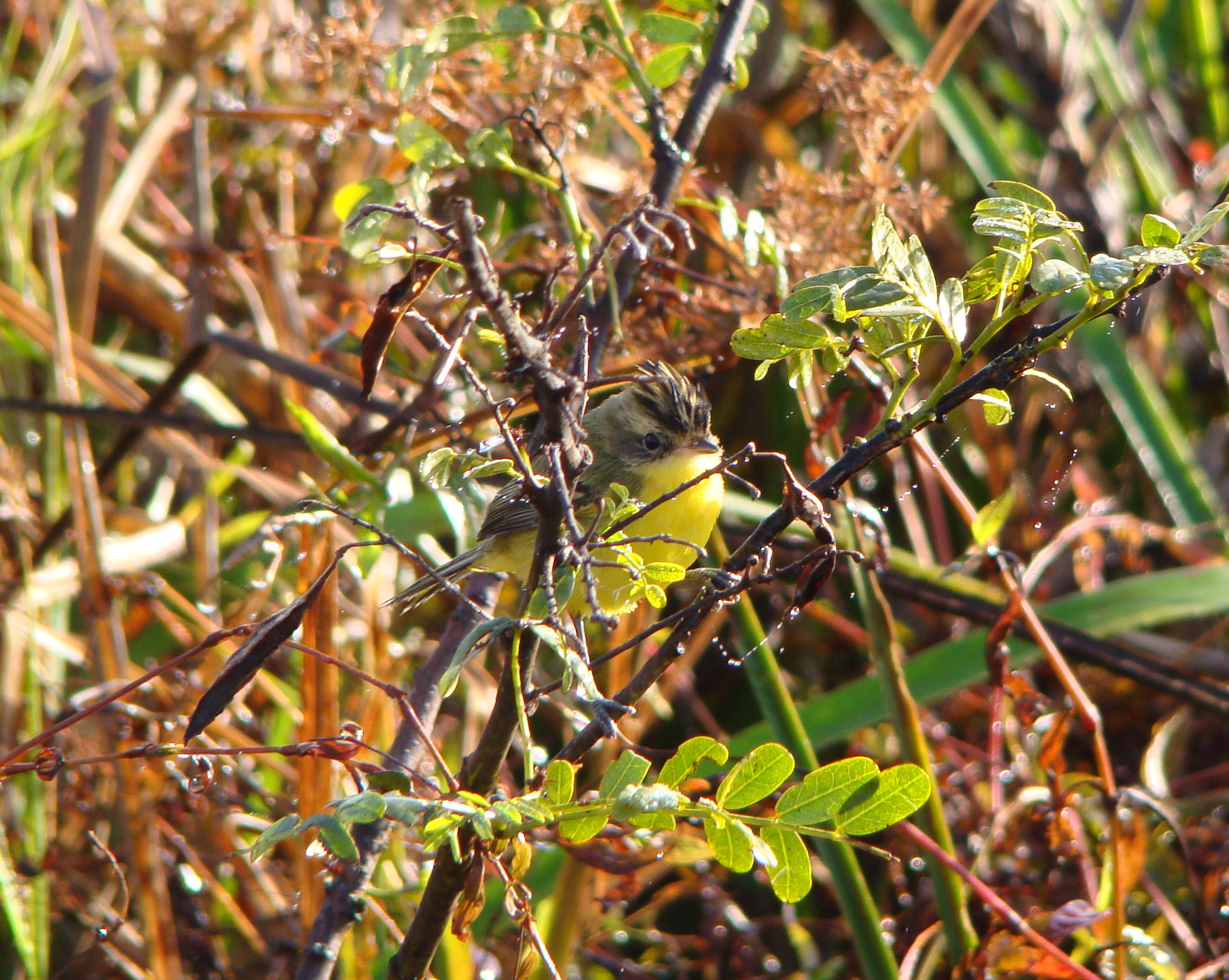

Conservation status
- Least Concern (IUCN 3.1)

Scientific classification
- Kingdom: Animalia
- Phylum: Chordata
- Class: Aves
- Order: Passeriformes
- Family: Tyrannidae
- Genus: Pseudocolopteryx
- Species: P. sclateri

Binomial name
- Pseudocolopteryx sclateri (Oustalet, 1892)

= Crested doradito =

Species of bird

The crested doradito (Pseudocolopteryx sclateri) is a species of bird in subfamily Elaeniinae of family Tyrannidae, the tyrant flycatchers. It is found in Argentina, Bolivia, Brazil, Guyana, Paraguay, Uruguay, and Venezuela, possibly in French Guiana, and as a vagrant to Trinidad.

== Taxonomy and systematics ==
The crested doradito is monotypic.

== Description ==
The crested doradito is 10 to 11 cm (3.9 to 4.3 in) long and weighs 6 to 9.9 g (0.21 to 0.35 oz). Both sexes have a shaggy crest. Adult males have a mostly pale olive head, upperparts, and tail. Their crown is blackish with yellowish white edges on the feathers and a partially hidden yellow stripe in the middle. Their cheeks are dusky, and their back has subtle dusky streaks. Their wings are pale olive with dull whitish edges on the flight feathers and wing coverts; the last show as two wing bars. Their throat and underparts are bright yellow. Adult females have a paler head than males, wider pale-yellow edges on the crown feathers, and a very faint pale yellow supercilium. Their underparts are a paler yellow than the male's. Both sexes have a dark brown iris and black legs and feet with a long hallux. Males have a slender, black, warbler-like bill; females' bills have a black maxilla like the males' and a pinkish-orange mandible. Juveniles are similar to adult females, but their crest has less black and more ochre, and their underparts are very pale.

== Distribution and habitat ==
The crested doradito has a highly disjunct distribution. Its largest single range is from eastern Bolivia south through southwestern Brazil and Paraguay into northeastern Argentina and Uruguay. There are isolated populations elsewhere in Bolivia and in Venezuela (mostly Falcón), Guyana, and in several parts of Brazil. It has occurred as a vagrant on Trinidad. The South American Classification Committee of the American Ornithological Society has unconfirmed sight records in French Guiana and therefore lists the species as hypothetical in that country. The species inhabits reed beds, marshes, and tall grassy areas near water. In elevation it reaches 500 m (1,600 ft) above sea level though only 200 m (700 ft) in Venezuela.

== Behavior ==
=== Movement ===
Though the crested doradito was previously thought to be migratory, it is now believed to be a year-round resident.

=== Feeding ===
The crested doradito's diet has not been detailed but is known to include insects and spiders. It typically forages in pairs or small family groups. It feeds in vegetation in marshes and along their borders, mostly by gleaning vegetation while perched, and often clinging sideways to sedge or reed stems to feed.

=== Breeding ===
The crested doradito breeds between September and January in the southern parts of its range. In Venezuela its season appears to include June or July. The few known nests were cups made variously of grasses, sedge stems, and thin rootlets, sometimes also including spider egg cases and insect cocoons as a lining or on the outside. They were attached to reed or sedge stems over water. In the south the clutch is two eggs. The clutch size elsewhere, incubation period, time to fledging, and details of parental care are not known.

=== Vocalization ===
As of late 2024 xeno-canto had no recordings of crested doradito vocalizations from Venezuela or Guayana. In the south the species' song is a "very high, liquid 'wic-wic-wic- -" and its call a "mellow wik wik". On Trinidad its song has been described as "a squeaky tsik-tsik-tsee-lee" and its call "a high, thin, soft sik".

== Status ==
The IUCN has assessed the crested doradito as being of Least Concern. It has a large range; its population size is not known and is believed to be stable. No immediate threats have been identified. It is "apparently very local, but sometimes quite common" and occurs in a few protected areas.
