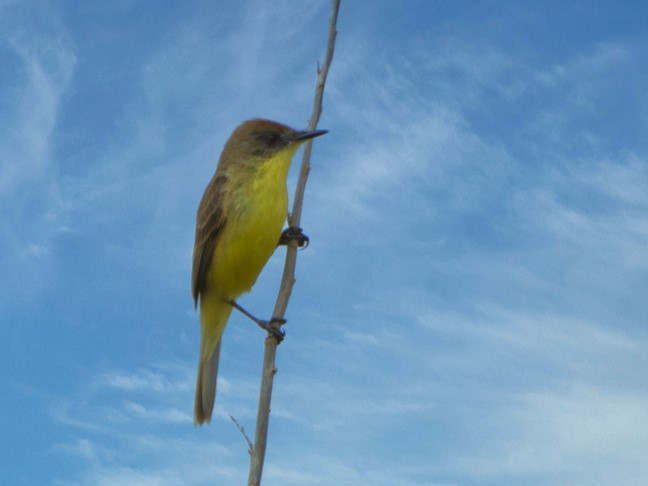

Conservation status
- Least Concern (IUCN 3.1)

Scientific classification
- Kingdom: Animalia
- Phylum: Chordata
- Class: Aves
- Order: Passeriformes
- Family: Tyrannidae
- Genus: Pseudocolopteryx
- Species: P. citreola

Binomial name
- Pseudocolopteryx citreola (Landbeck, 1864)

= Ticking doradito =

Species of bird

The ticking doradito (Pseudocolopteryx citreola) is a species of bird in subfamily Elaeniinae of family Tyrannidae, the tyrant flycatchers. It is found in Argentina, Bolivia, Chile, and possibly Paraguay.

== Taxonomy and systematics ==
The ticking doradito is monotypic. It was previously included within the warbling doradito (P. flaviventris) without being recognized as a subspecies. Taxonomic systems began separating them in 2010 based primarily on vocal differences.

== Description ==
The ticking doradito is about 12.5 cm (4.9 in) long and weighs 7.5 to 10 g (0.26 to 0.35 oz). The sexes have the same plumage. Adults have a mostly dull olive-brown head and upperparts. Their crown is rufescent, their lores and cheeks are dusky, and their tail is dusky olive-brown. Their wings are dull olive-brown with cinnamon edges on the flight feathers and tips on the wing coverts; the last show as two thin wing bars. Their throat and underparts are lemon yellow. Both sexes have a medium brown iris and dark gray legs and feet. Males have a slender, black, warbler-like bill; females have a mostly black bill with a pale pinkish base to the mandible.

== Distribution and habitat ==
The ticking doradito is found in Chile between Valparaíso and Los Ríos regions, in Argentina from Chubut Province north, and in southern and central Bolivia. An unconfirmed sight record in Paraguay leads the South American Classification Committee of the American Ornithological Society to call it hypothetical in that country. The species inhabits areas dense with Baccharis shrubs, somewhat open areas and brushlands with Tamarix shrubs and trees, and freshwater reed beds. In Chile it also occurs in marshes and willow thickets along watercourses. In elevation it occurs between 300 and 1,300 m (1,000 and 4,300 ft) in Argentina and as low as sea level in Chile.

== Behavior ==
=== Movement ===
The ticking doradito is almost completely migratory. The Chilean population crosses the Andes after the breeding season, either to northern Argentina or Bolivia. Most of the Argentinian population moves to the far northern part of the country and Bolivia. There are also scattered records in eastern Argentina in both the breeding and non-breeding seasons and one sight record in Paraguay.

=== Feeding ===
As far as is known, the ticking doradito's diet and foraging behavior are the same as those of the warbling doradito. That species' diet has not been detailed but is known to be primarily insects. It forages singly or in small family groups, typically low and deep in the vegetation. It takes prey mostly by gleaning while perched and occasionally with short flights to hover-glean.

=== Breeding ===
The ticking doradito's breeding season in Argentina includes November and December but nothing else is known about the species' breeding timing. The few know nests were constructed of plant fibers such as grass and Phragmites, thin rootlets, small sticks, and spider web. One nest held three eggs. The incubation period, time to fledging, and details of parental care are not known.

=== Vocalization ===
The ticking doradito's song is "a series of notes starting with low clicking sounds (like pebbles being struck together) repeated slowly, then with increasing rapidity before an abrupt termination, e.g., 'tick, tick, tick, tick-tick-tick-you' or 'tic tic tic tic tic tirik-tirik' ". It also makes a "tek" call.

== Status ==
The IUCN has assessed the ticking doradito as being of Least Concern. It has a large range; its population size is not known and is believed to be decreasing. No immediate threats have been identified. It is considered locally common in western Argentina but "rather uncommon and local" in Chile.
