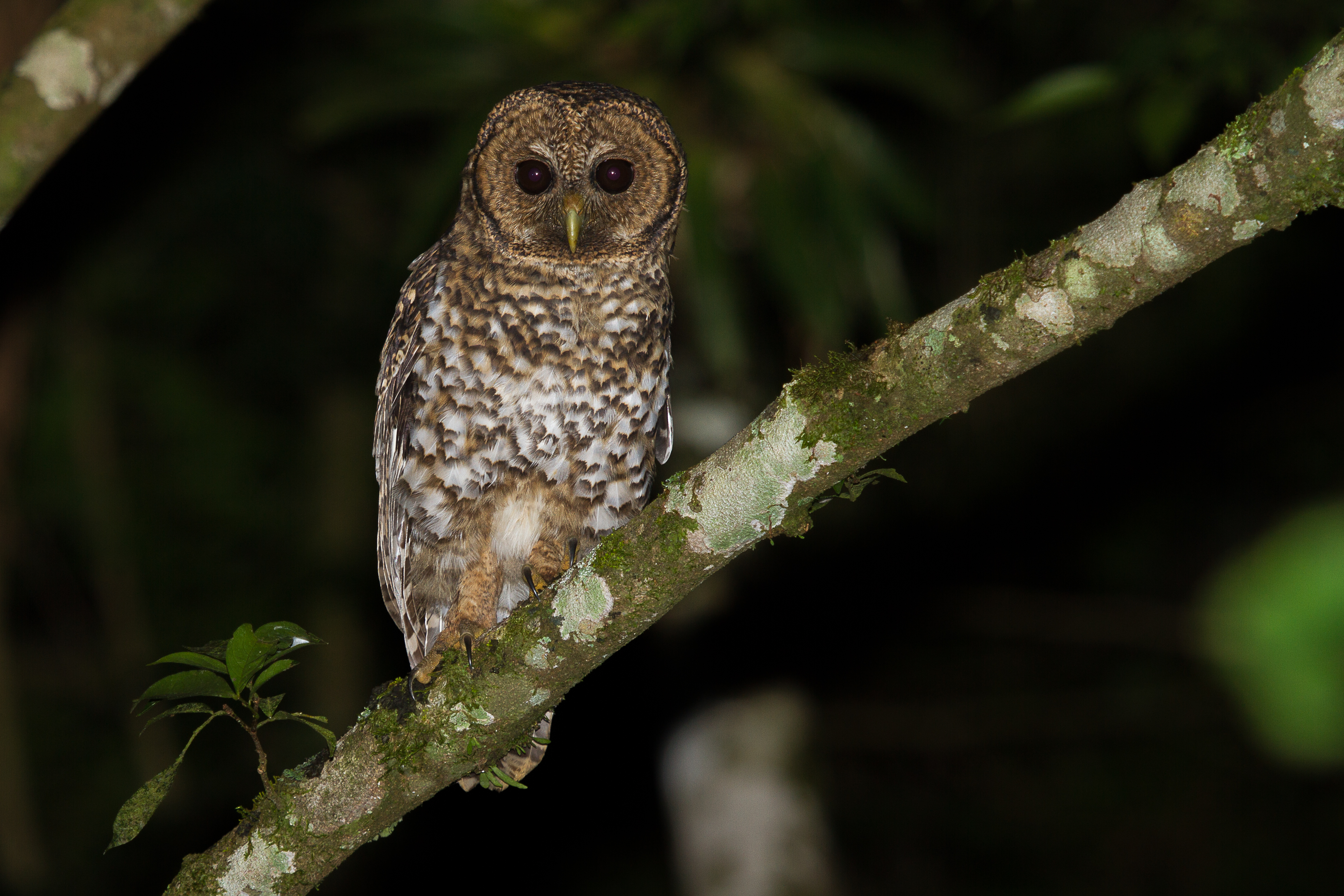

Conservation status
- Least Concern (IUCN 3.1)
- CITES Appendix II

Scientific classification
- Kingdom: Animalia
- Phylum: Chordata
- Class: Aves
- Order: Strigiformes
- Family: Strigidae
- Genus: Strix
- Species: S. hylophila

Binomial name
- Strix hylophila Temminck, 1825

= Rusty-barred owl =

Species of owl

The rusty-barred owl (Strix hylophila) is a medium-sized "typical owl" in subfamily Striginae. It is found in Argentina, Brazil (where it is known as the Brazilian owl), and Paraguay.

== Taxonomy and systematics ==
The rusty-barred owl is one of seven members of genus Strix found in South America, according to the International Ornithological Committee (IOC). It appears to be most closely related to the Chaco owl (S. chacoensis) and rufous-legged owl (S. rufipes). (Note: The IOC and the South American Classification Committee (SACC) of the American Ornithological Society place seven South American species in Strix. However, of the seven, the Clements taxonomy and BirdLife International's Handbook of the Birds of the World (HBW) put only the rusty-barred, Chaco, and rufous-legged owls in Strix and the other four in genus Ciccaba. All four taxonomies include several North and Middle American species in Strix.) All three have vocalizations that are very different from those of other Strix owls and genetic studies may find that they belong in their own genus. The rusty-barred owl is monotypic.

== Description ==
The rusty-barred owl is about 35 cm (14 in) long. Males weigh 250 to 340 g (8.8 to 12 oz) and females 275 to 395 g (9.7 to 14 oz). The species has light rusty brown facial discs with concentric darker brown rings and small white "eyebrows". Adults' upperparts have white, brown, and orange-buff barring. The chest and flanks are orangish buff and the belly is whiter; both areas have dark brown bars. The legs are feathered. The eyes are dark brown, the bill yellowish horn, and the toes yellowish gray. Juveniles are overall buff with faint darker barring.

== Distribution and habitat ==
The rusty-barred owl is found in southeastern Brazil from Minas Gerais to Rio Grande do Sul, in southeastern Paraguay, and in Argentina's extreme northeastern Misiones Province. It inhabits the interior and edges of a variety of wooded landscapes including montane, tropical evergreen, and temperate forest; secondary forest; and pine platations. It can be found close to human habitation. In elevation it ranges from sea level to at least 1,000 m (3,300 ft).

== Behavior ==
=== Movement ===
The rusty-barred owl is believed to be a year-round resident throughout its range.

=== Feeding ===
The rusty-barred owl is a nocturnal hunter. Though its diet has not been extensively studied, it is known to include small mammals, birds, and arthropods, and probably also reptiles and amphibians. One study in Brazil found that about three quarters of the prey was rodents, and marsupials were most of the other quarter. It sometimes forages in the forest canopy.

=== Breeding ===
The rusty-barred owl's breeding season appears to be between August and October, though it has also been reported to be between December and March. It nests in a cavity in a tree. The female incubates the clutch of two or three eggs for 28 to 29 days. Males provision the female and nestlings and are reported to also brood nestlings. Young leave the nest 32 to 35 days after hatch and are independent about three months after that.

=== Vocalization ===
The rusty-barred owl's song is a "frog-like deep grunting 'grugruu-grugruugrugru'." Both sexes sing, sometimes in duet. They also make "rrrrroh" and "long-drawn 'i-ew-eh'" calls.

== Status ==
The IUCN has assessed the rusty-barred owl as being of Least Concern. However, it has a somewhat limited range and its population is believed to be decreasing because of habitat loss through burning and logging. It does occur in a few protected areas.
