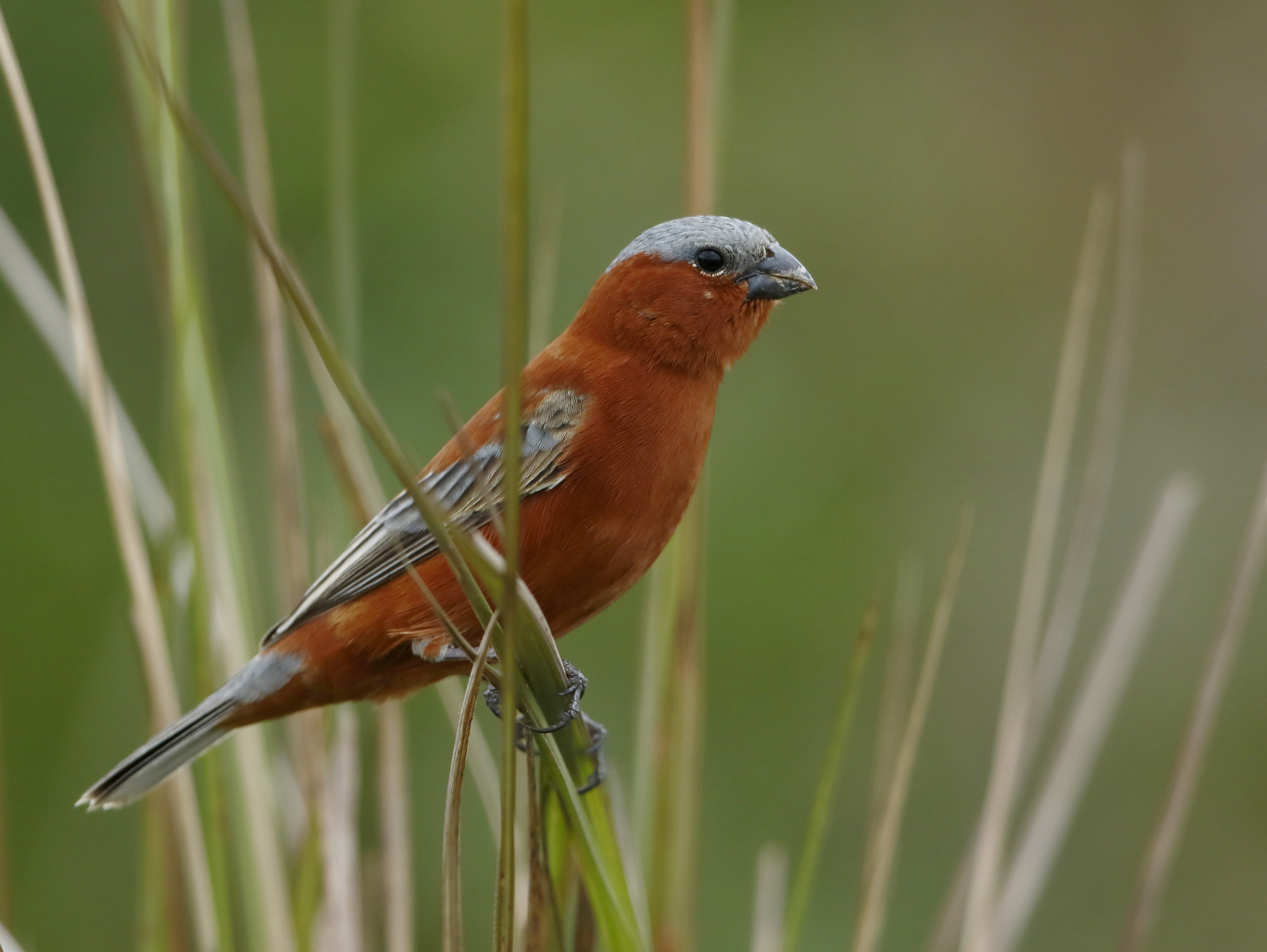
- Male
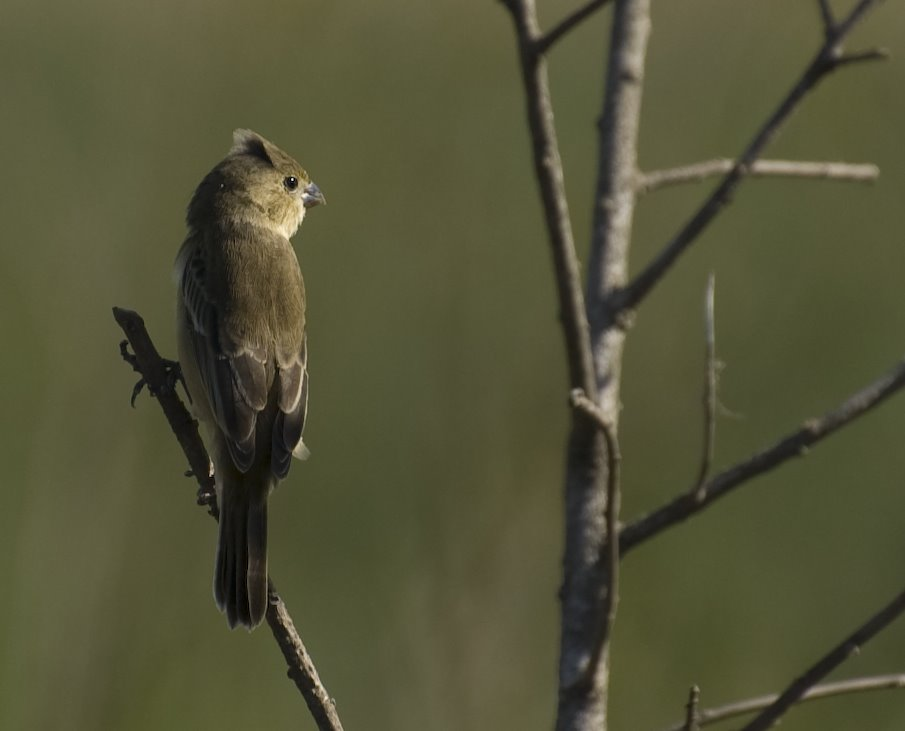
- Female

Conservation status
- Vulnerable (IUCN 3.1)

Scientific classification
- Kingdom: Animalia
- Phylum: Chordata
- Class: Aves
- Order: Passeriformes
- Family: Thraupidae
- Genus: Sporophila
- Species: S. cinnamomea

Binomial name
- Sporophila cinnamomea (Lafresnaye, 1839)
- Breeding Non-Breeding Migration

= Chestnut seedeater =

Species of bird

The chestnut seedeater (Sporophila cinnamomea) is a Vulnerable species of bird in the family Thraupidae, the tanagers and allies. It is found in Argentina, Brazil, Paraguay, and Uruguay.

== Taxonomy and systematics ==
The chestnut seedeater has a somewhat complicated taxonomic history. It was formally described in 1839 with the binomial Pyrrhula cinnamomea.The genus was then in the family Fringillidae. By 1938 it had been reclassified as Sporophila cinnamomea, still in the family Fringillidae. By 1970 the genus Sporophila had been reassigned to the family Emberizidae. Based on studies published between 1988 and 2011, beginning in 2012 Sporophila was moved to the tanager family Thraupidae.

The chestnut seedeater is monotypic.

== Description ==
The chestnut seedeater is about 10 cm (3.9 in) long and weighs an average of about 8.6 g (0.30 oz). It is one of the smallest of its genus. It has a smallish bill with a rounded culmen. The species is sexually dimorphic. Adult males have a medium gray crown to just below the eye; the rest of their head is chestnut. Their body is almost entirely chestnut with medium gray uppertail coverts. Their tail is mostly dark brown with cinnamon-brown feather edges. Their wings' greater and median coverts are dark grayish brown with light gray edges. Their flight feathers are dark grayish brown with cinnamon-brown edges and the primaries have white bases that show as a patch on the folded wing. Females have a mostly warm sandy brown head with a buff face. Their upperparts are also warm sandy brown and their tail is darker brown. Their wings are darker brown with sandy edges on the coverts. Their underparts are mostly warm buff with a whitish belly. Both sexes have a dark brown iris and black legs. Males have a black bill; females have a dark horn-colored one. Juveniles resemble adult females.

== Distribution and habitat ==
The chestnut seedeater is found from most of Uruguay and northeastern Argentina's Entre Rios Province north through eastern Paraguay and Brazil to Tocantins. At its widest its range spans from northeastern Paraguay across Brazil from western Mato Grosso do Sul to Rio de Janeiro state. It inhabits grasslands with some shrubs, especially but not exclusively seasonally flooded lowlands and marshes.

== Behavior ==
=== Movement ===
The chestnut seedeater is a complete migrant. It breeds in Argentina, western to southeastern Uruguay, extreme southeastern Brazil, and extreme southeastern Paraguay. In late February and early March it begins to move north through a small migration zone to its winter range in eastern Paraguay and Brazil. It departs for its breeding range beginning in early September.

=== Feeding ===
The chestnut seedeater feeds on grass seeds, especially those of native grasses, and also includes some small arthropods in its diet. It typically feeds while clinging to stems, sometimes upside down as the stem bends. In the breeding season it forages in pairs or family groups and outside it in larger groups that include other seed-eating species.

=== Breeding ===
The chestnut seedeater breeds during the austral spring and summer of October to March. The female builds the nest, a cup made from plant material and spider web. It can be placed in a shrub, an herbaceous plant, or in a clump of grass, usually within about 0.5 m (1.5 ft) of the ground or water. Most clutches are of two eggs though one and three are known. The female alone incubates, for 11 to 13 days. Fledging occurs nine to 12 days after hatch and both parents provision nestlings. There are a few records of brood parasitism by the shiny cowbird (Molothrus bonariensis).

=== Vocalization ===
The chestnut seedeater's song is a "sweet, melodious, and pleasant note series, consisting largely of descending whistles...transcribed as tweew tii-tweeew tweew, peew put-tweew tuu-twii nhhhnhhh tweew...". Males sing from a prominent perch.

== Status ==
The IUCN originally in 1988 assessed the chestnut seedeater as Threatened, then in 1994 as Near Threatened, and since 2000 as Vulnerable. It has a large range; its estimated population of between 2500 and 10,000 mature individuals is believed to be decreasing. "Heavy trapping pressure is compounded by extensive habitat conversion. Rapid afforestation with Eucalyptus and Pinus spp. is even affecting wet valley bottoms, regardless of subsequent poor tree growth. Pesticides and other chemicals are carried by drainage and run-off directly into marshes. Mechanised agriculture, invasive grasses and annual burning additionally threaten winter and migration habitats." It is overall "locally fairly common and very patchily distributed". It occurs in several national parks and other protected areas. It is "uncommon to rare" in Brazil.
