= List of amphibians of Uruguay =

The amphibians of Uruguay are diverse.

== Species ==
- Argenteohyla siemersi
- Dendropsophus nanus
- Elachistocleis bicolor
- Hypsiboas pulchellus
- Leptodactylus podicipinus
- Limnomedusa macroglossa
- Lysapsus limellum
- Melanophryniscus pachyrhynus
- Pleurodema bibroni
- Pseudis minuta
- Pseudopaludicola falcipes
- Rhinella achavali
- Rhinella schneideri

== See also ==
- Fauna of Uruguay
