= Fauna of Uruguay =

Native animals of Uruguay

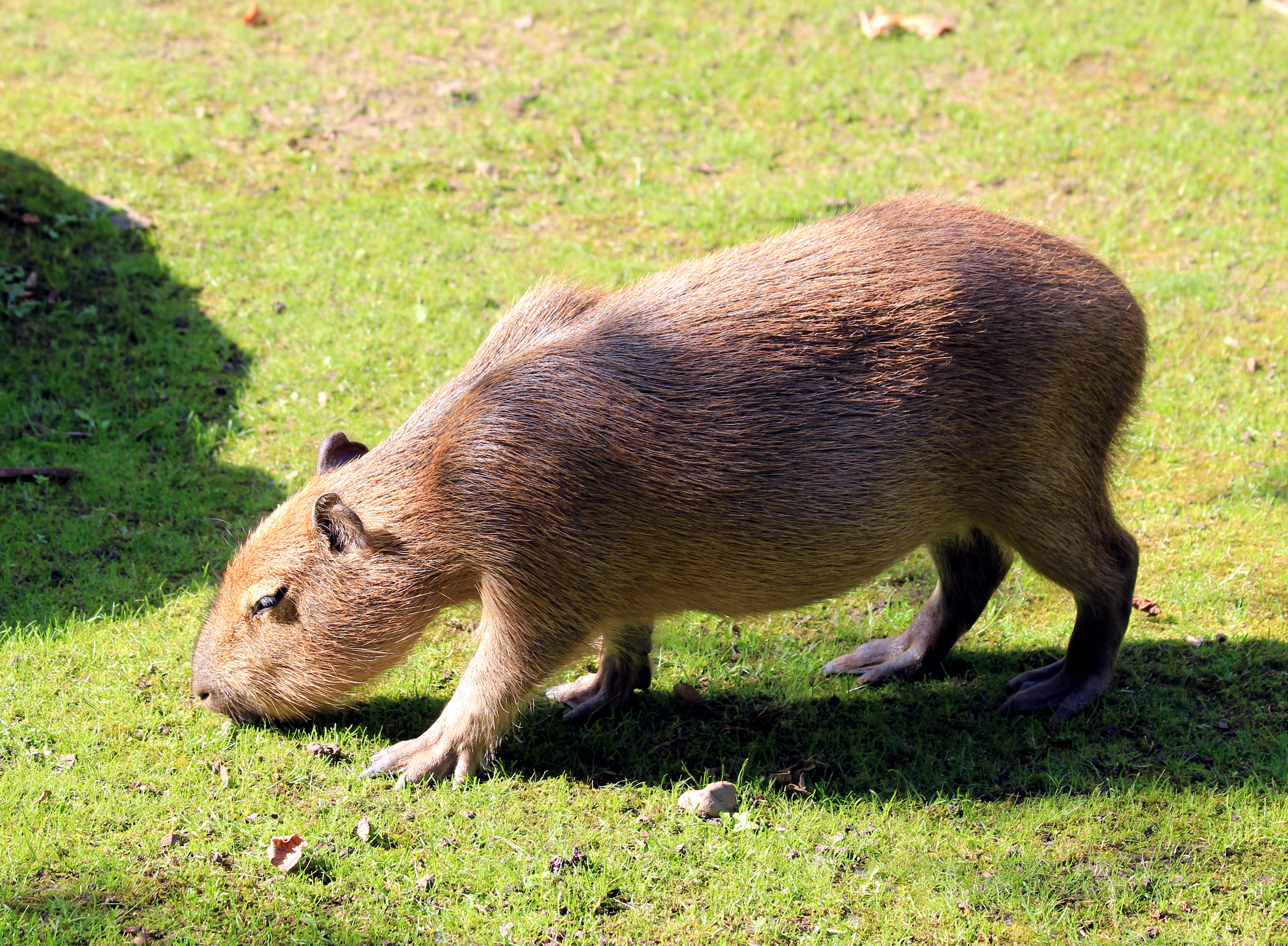
Capybara

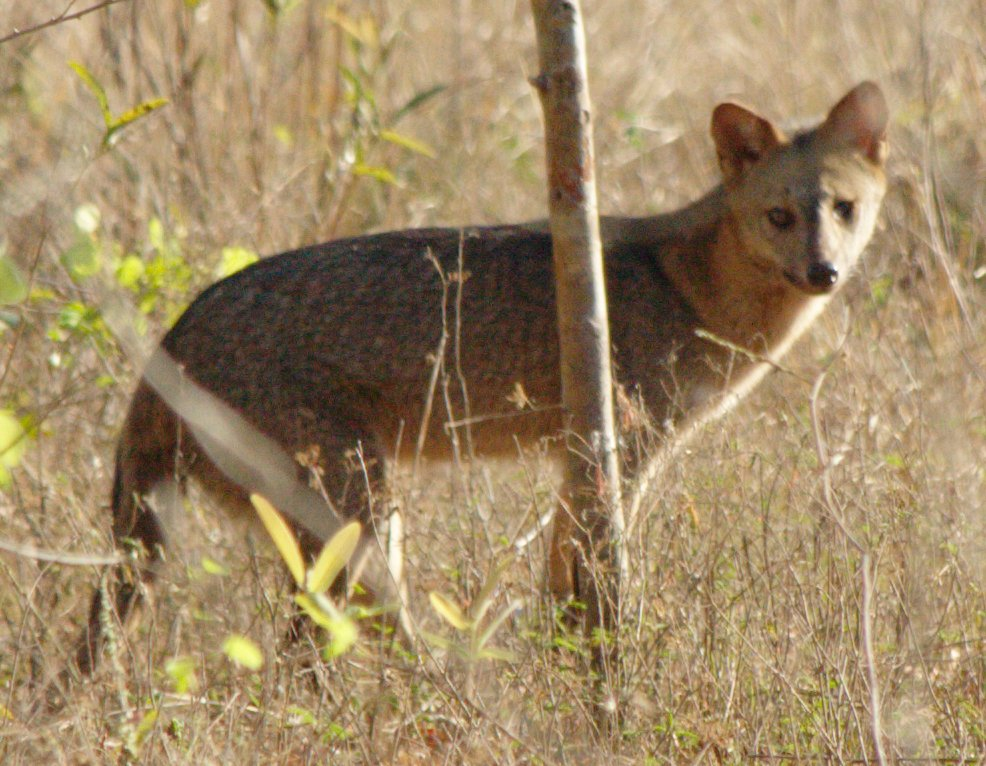
Crab-eating fox

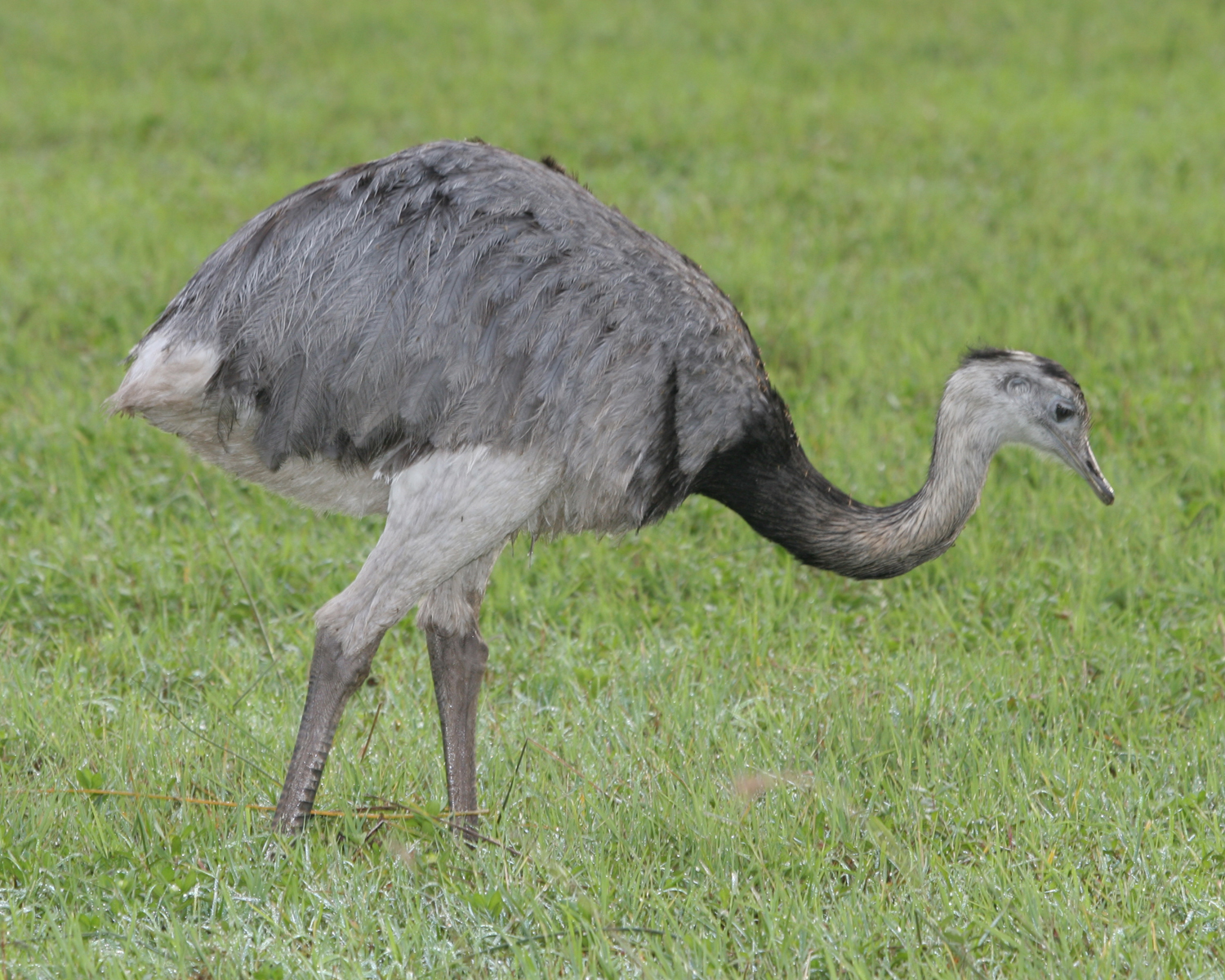
Greater rhea

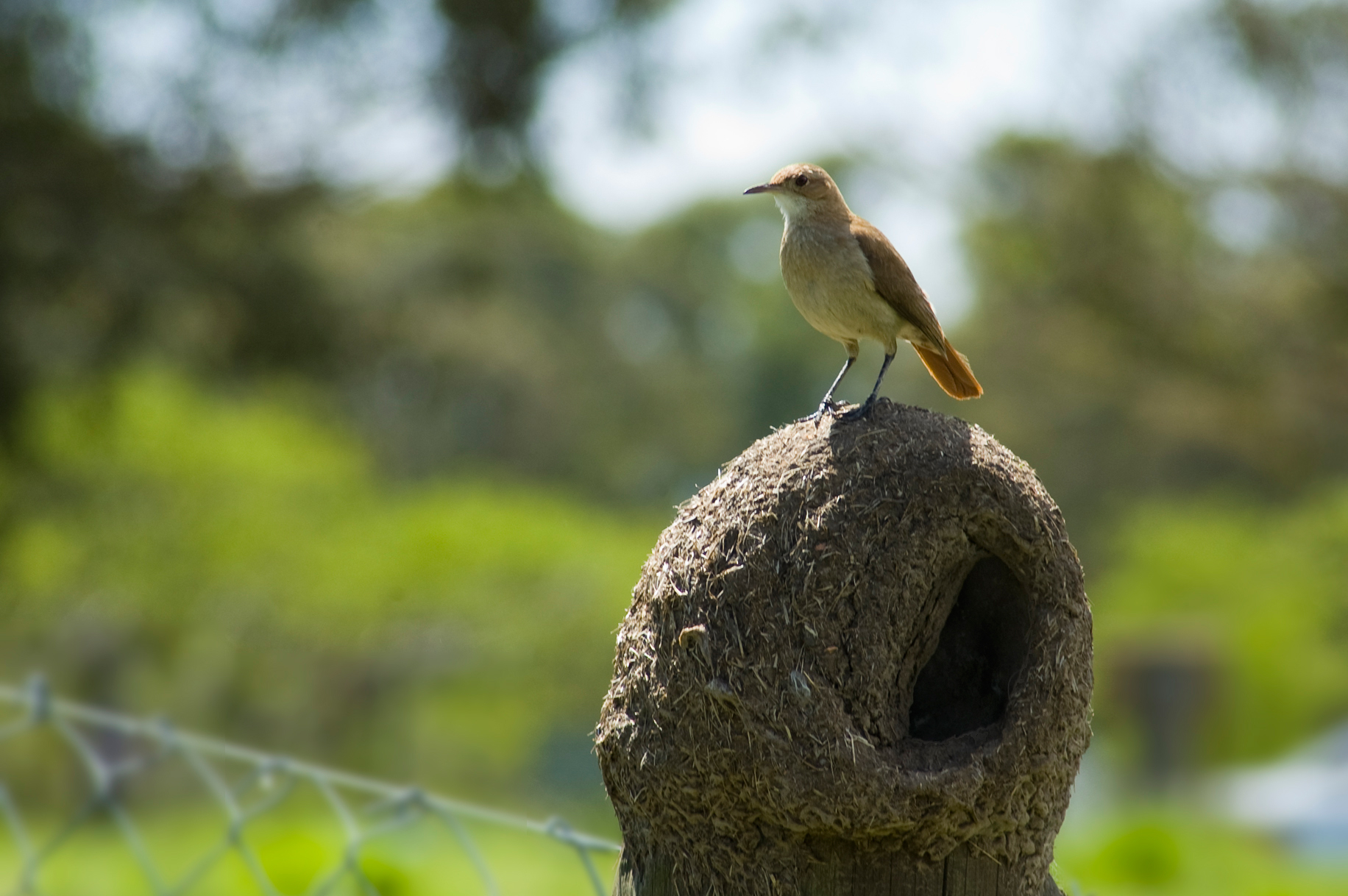
Red ovenbird

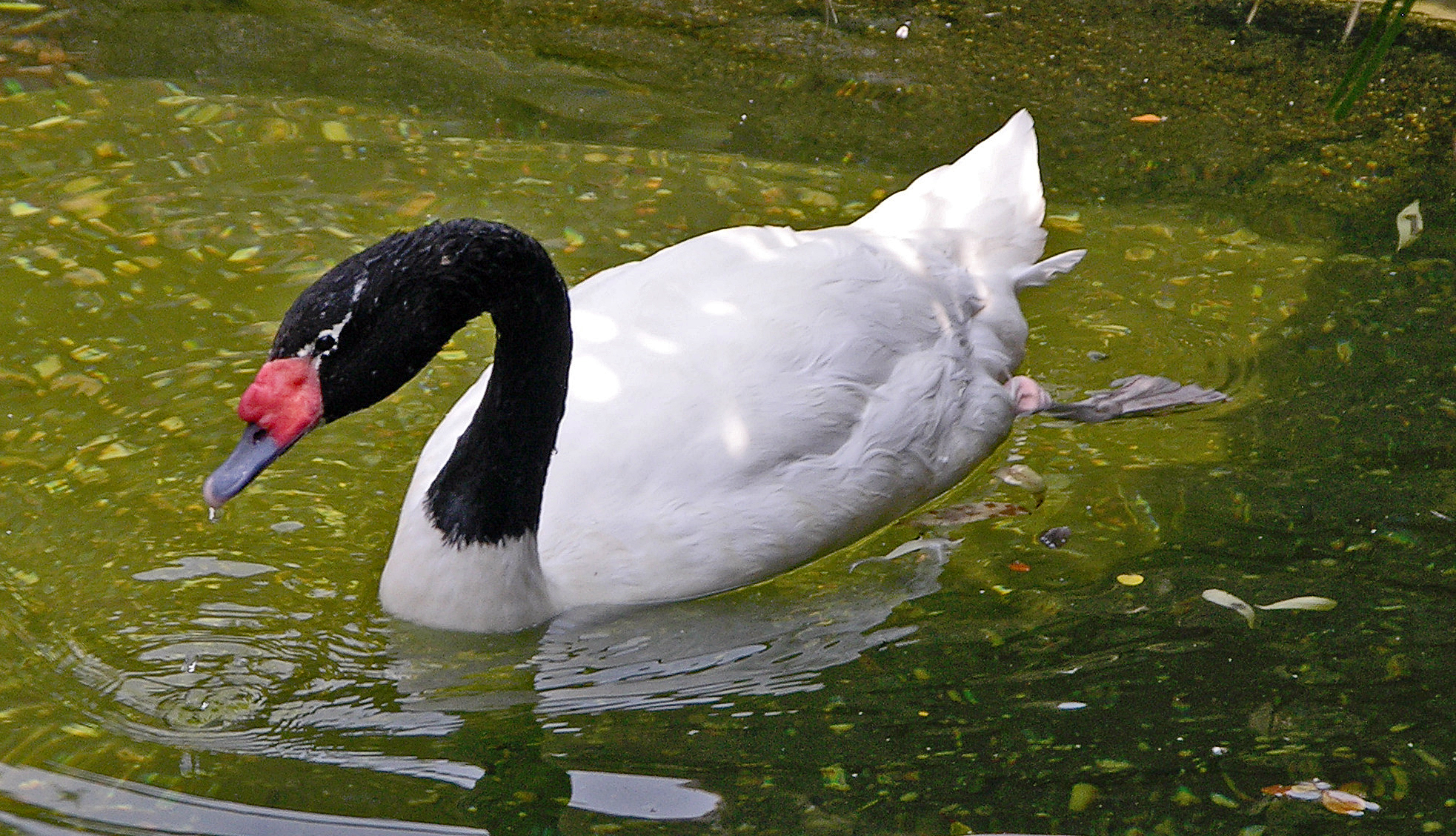
Black-necked swan

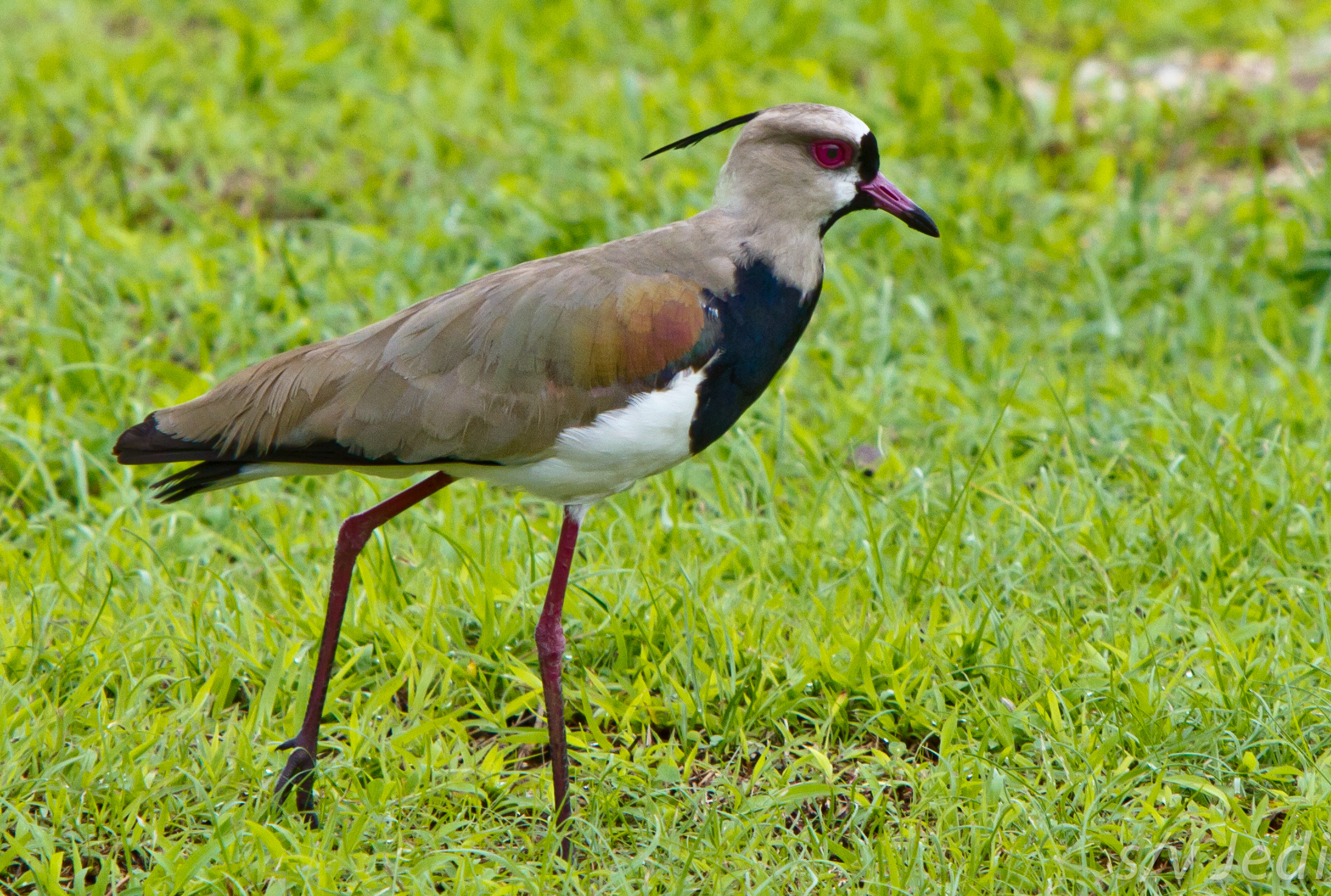
Southern lapwing

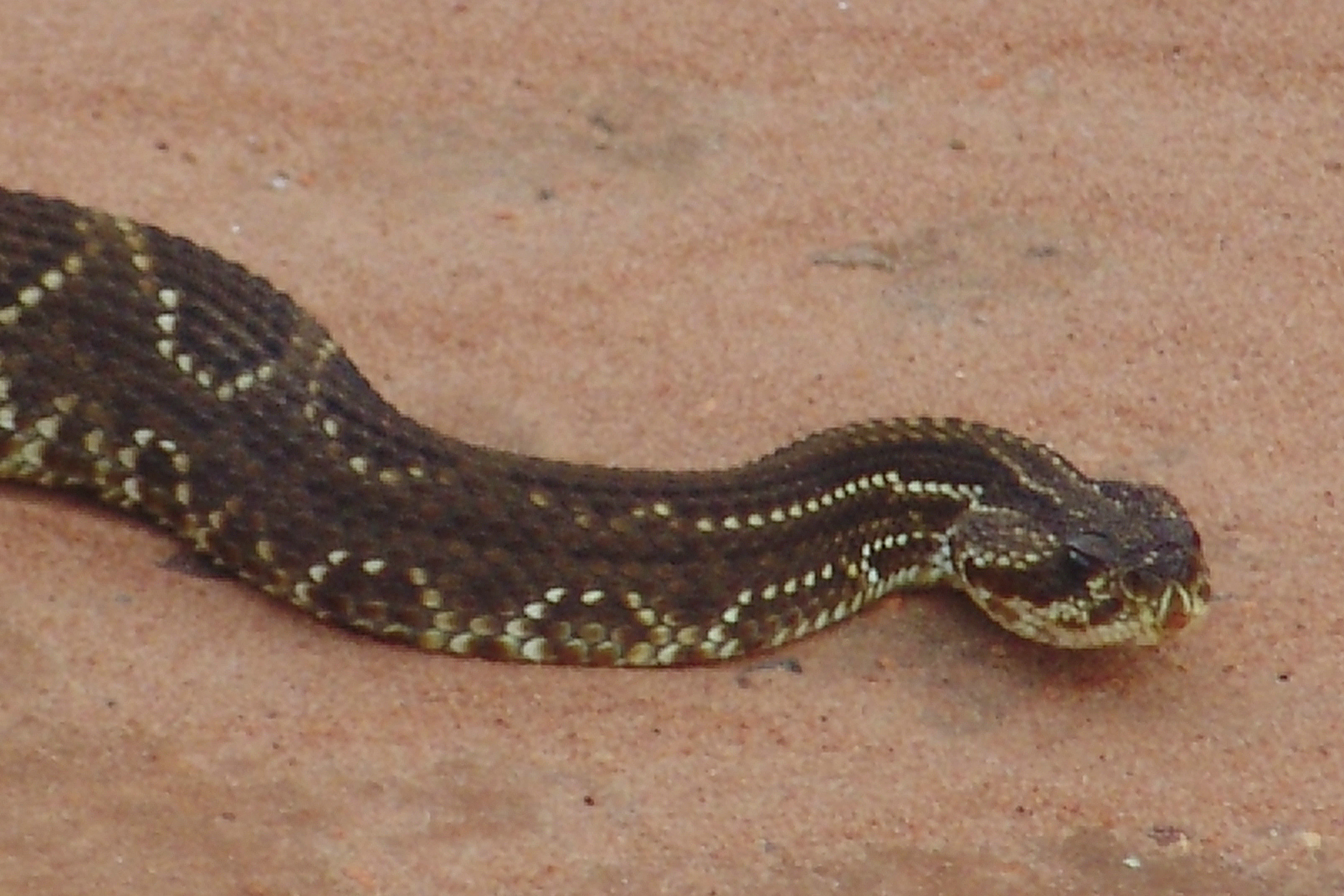
Rattlesnake

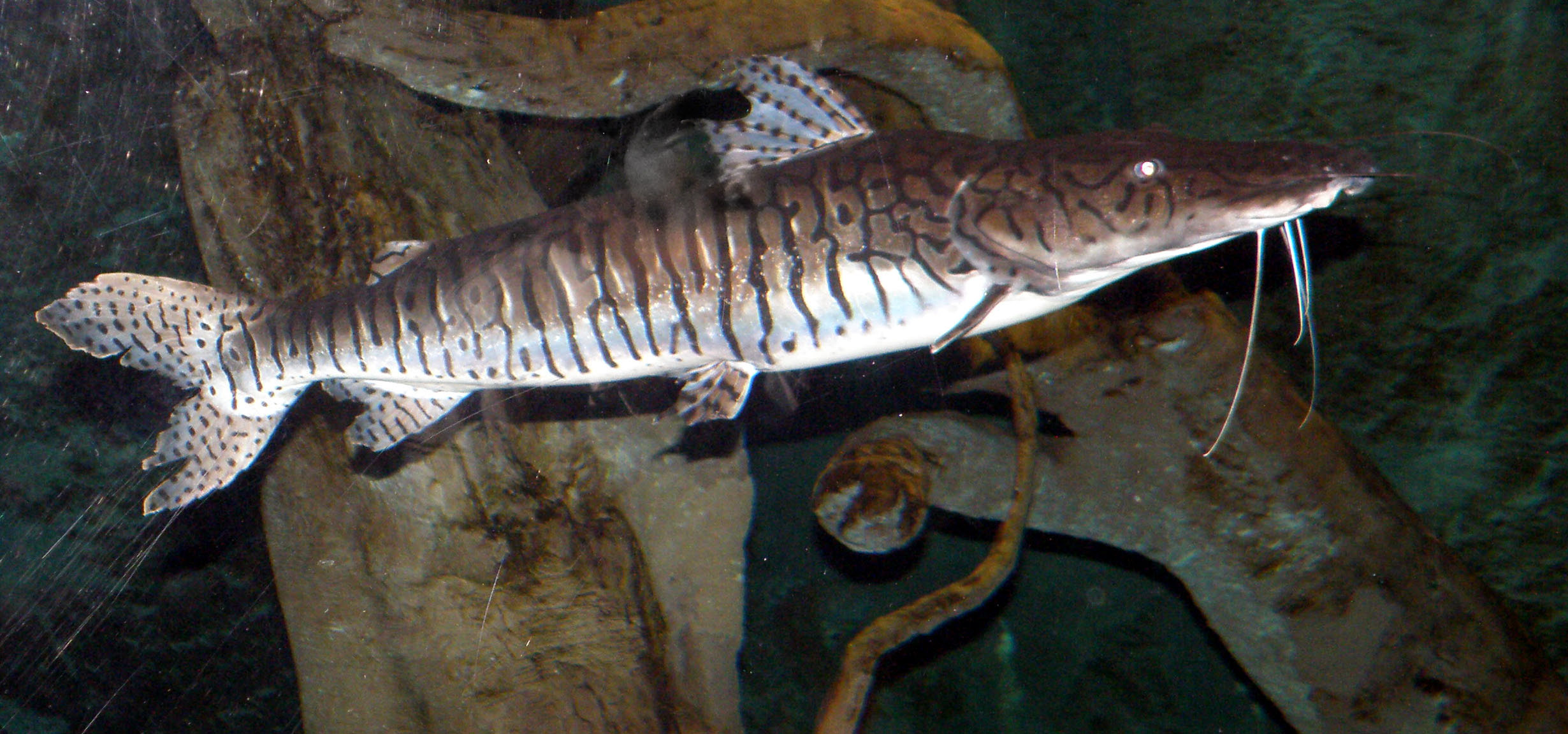
Sorubim

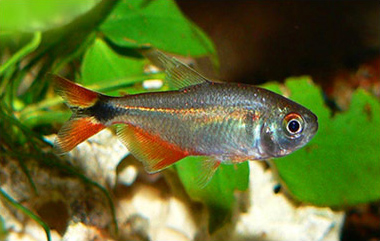
Tetra

The fauna of Uruguay is a part of the wildlife of Uruguay.

== Overview ==
It is characteristic of the Uruguayan savanna. Grazing mammals include the Pampas deer (Ozotoceros bezoarticus), the [gray brocket] or Guazuvirá deer (Mazama gouazoubira), and the capybara (Hydrochoerus hydrochaeris), the world's largest living rodent.

Uruguay is home to a rich avifauna, including the Southern lapwing and the magnificent black-necked swan. As a result, birdwatching has become popular in selected locations.

There are several snakes, with four venomous species: the rattlesnake (Crotalus durissus terrificus), coral snake (Micrurus altirostris), yarará (Bothrops pubescens), and crossed pit viper (Bothrops alternatus).

Despite the humid climate of much of the country, the vast majority of Uruguay's land is made up of savannas, so there is not much amphibian diversity. However, the Argentine horned frog, Ceratophrys ornata, thrives in the savannas of central and northwestern Uruguay. Other notable amphibian species of Uruguay include Pseudis minuta, Boana pulchella, Rhinella achavali, and Rhinella diptycha.

Waterlife is also rich, with species such as the tararira (Hoplias malabaricus) or the white-dotted skate.

== Extinct species ==
Extinct fauna includes megafauna, such as Josephoartigasia monesi, Lestobradys, and Glyptodon (some of them coexisted with the arrival of humans, who were responsible for their extinction).

Older extinct species include Uruguaysuchus, Meridiosaurus and Neuquensaurus, all from the Cretaceous.

Jaguars are extinct in Uruguay.

== See also ==
- List of amphibians of Uruguay
- List of birds of Uruguay
- List of mammals of Uruguay
- List of non-marine molluscs of Uruguay
- Flora of Uruguay
- Funga of Uruguay
- Uruguayan savanna
