= Flora of Uruguay =

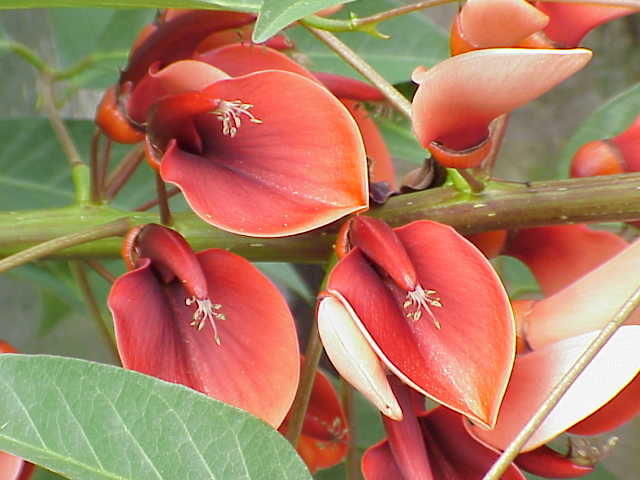
Ceibo (Erythrina crista-galli), the national flower of Uruguay

The flora of Uruguay consists of 2,500 species distributed among 150 native and foreign biological families. Approximately 80% of Uruguay is prairie, with grasses predominating. Uruguay is primarily a grass-growing land, with vegetation that is essentially a continuation of the Argentine Pampas. Forest areas are relatively small. Trees grow in bunches.

Forested areas are much smaller than in the pampas, but contain a mix of hardwoods and softwoods, while eucalyptus were imported from Australia.

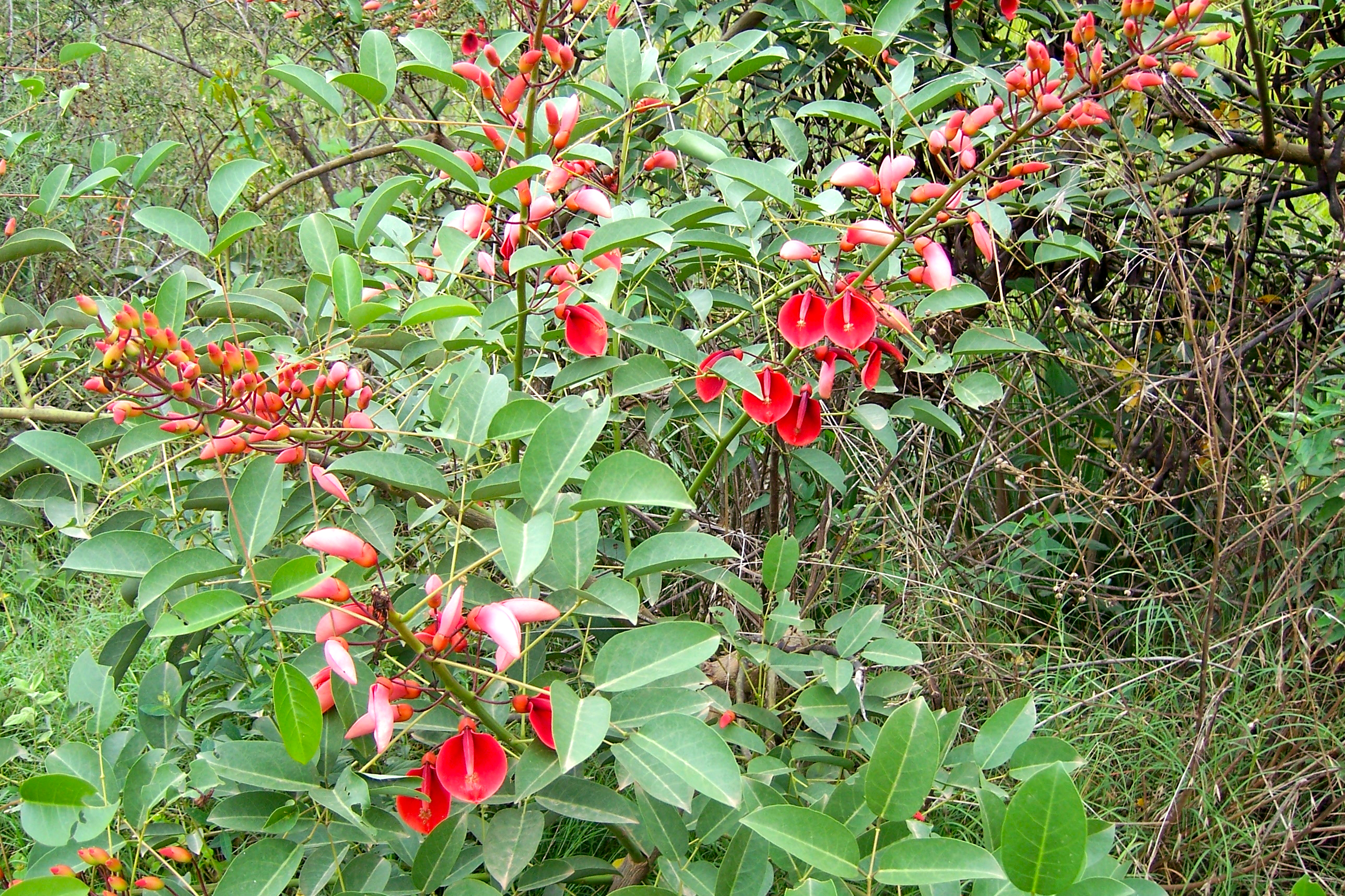
Ceibo (Erythrina crista-galli)

"Ceibo", or Erythrina cristagalli, is the national flower.

== Herbs ==
Uruguay contains many herbs, ferns, and flowers.

- Peperomia
- Ferns (Blechnum)
- Ferns (Pteris)
- Ferns (Adiantum)
- Ferns (Dicksonia)
- Orchidales
- Ferns (Anemia)
- Ferns (Dryopteris)
- Ferns (Asplenium)
- Ferns (Pteridium)

== Riverine forests ==
Natural forests in Uruguay mainly grow near rivers in the countryside.

The native forests are composed of more than 500 native species, including palms. The most abundant are "sauce criollo" (Salix humboldtiana), "sarandí colorado" (Cephalanthus glabratus), "sarandí blanco" (Phyllanthus sellowianus) and "mataojos" (Pouteria salicifolia).

== Natural prairie ==
The natural prairie in Uruguay constitutes about 14,000,000 acres (5,700,000 ha) (80% of the country) and contains some 2000 species including 400 grass species. The prairie includes Canelones, Colonia, San Jose, Flores, Florida, Lavalleja and Soriano.

In the prairies "Tala" (Celtis tala), "Molle rastrero" (Schinus longifolius), "Espina amarilla" (Berberis laurina) and "Coronilla" (Scutia buxifolia) thrive, and Cortaderia selloana can be found.

== Native bushes ==
In the valleys, bush lands dominated by shrubs instead of trees or grasses predominate. Common native bushes include (Scutia buxifolia), "Arrayán" (Blepharocalyx salicifolius), "Chal-Chal" (Allophyllus edulis), and "Guayabo Colorado" (Eugenia cisplatensis).

== Gallery ==
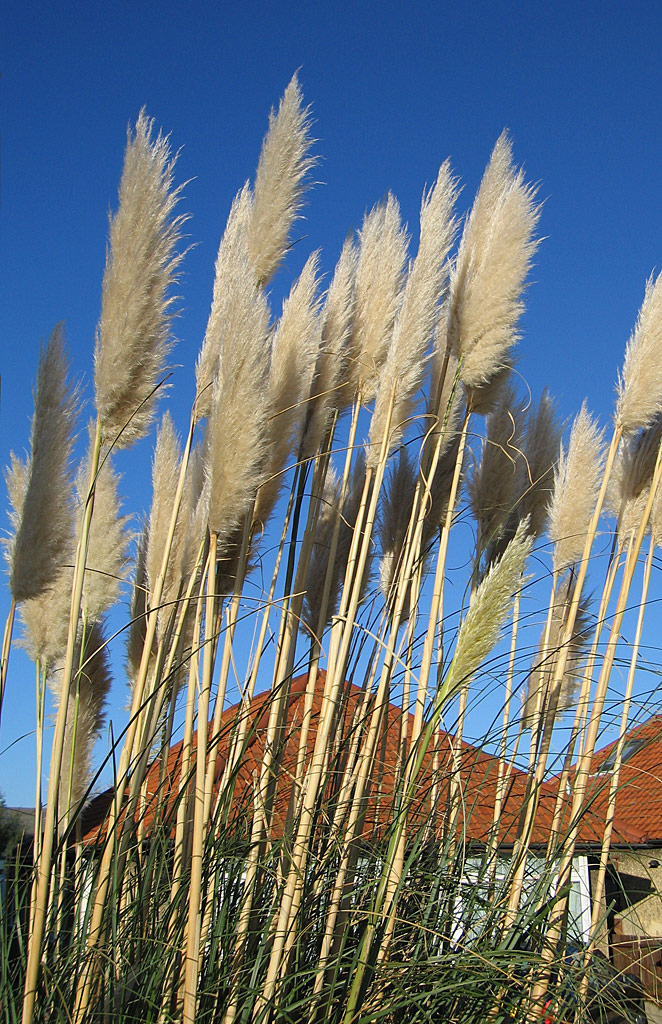
Pampas grass

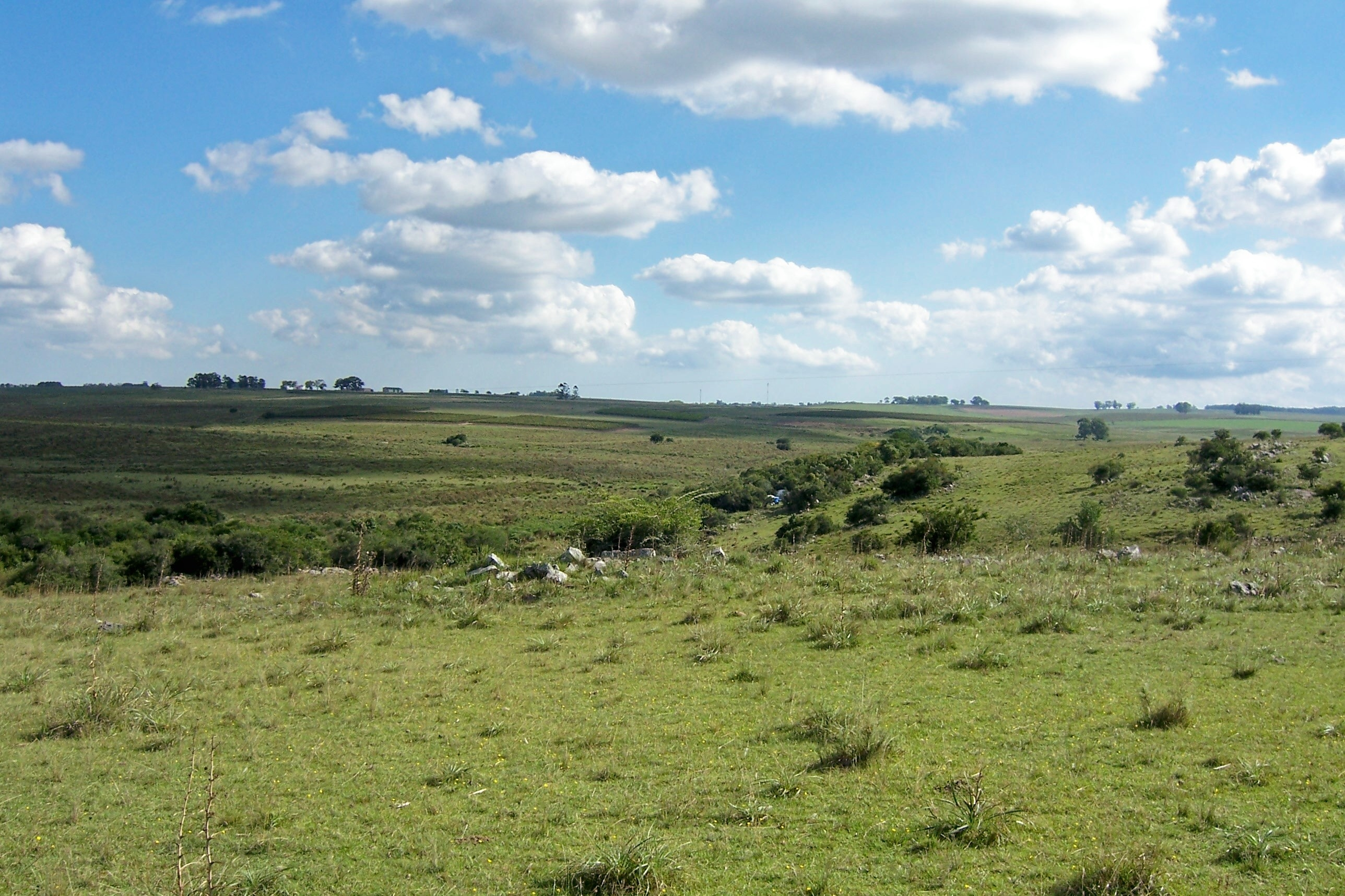
Prairie and forest in San José

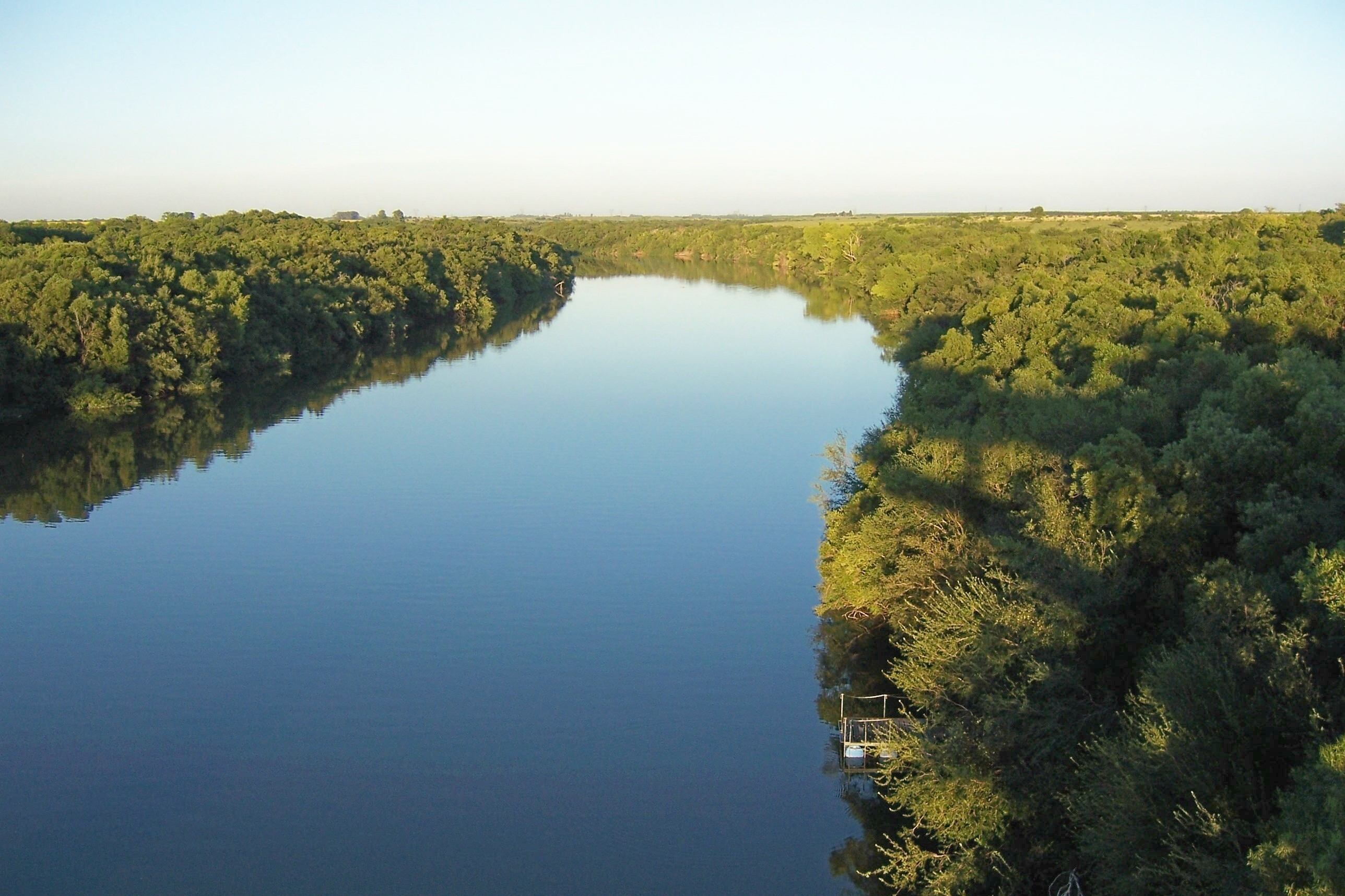
River forest near Río Queguay

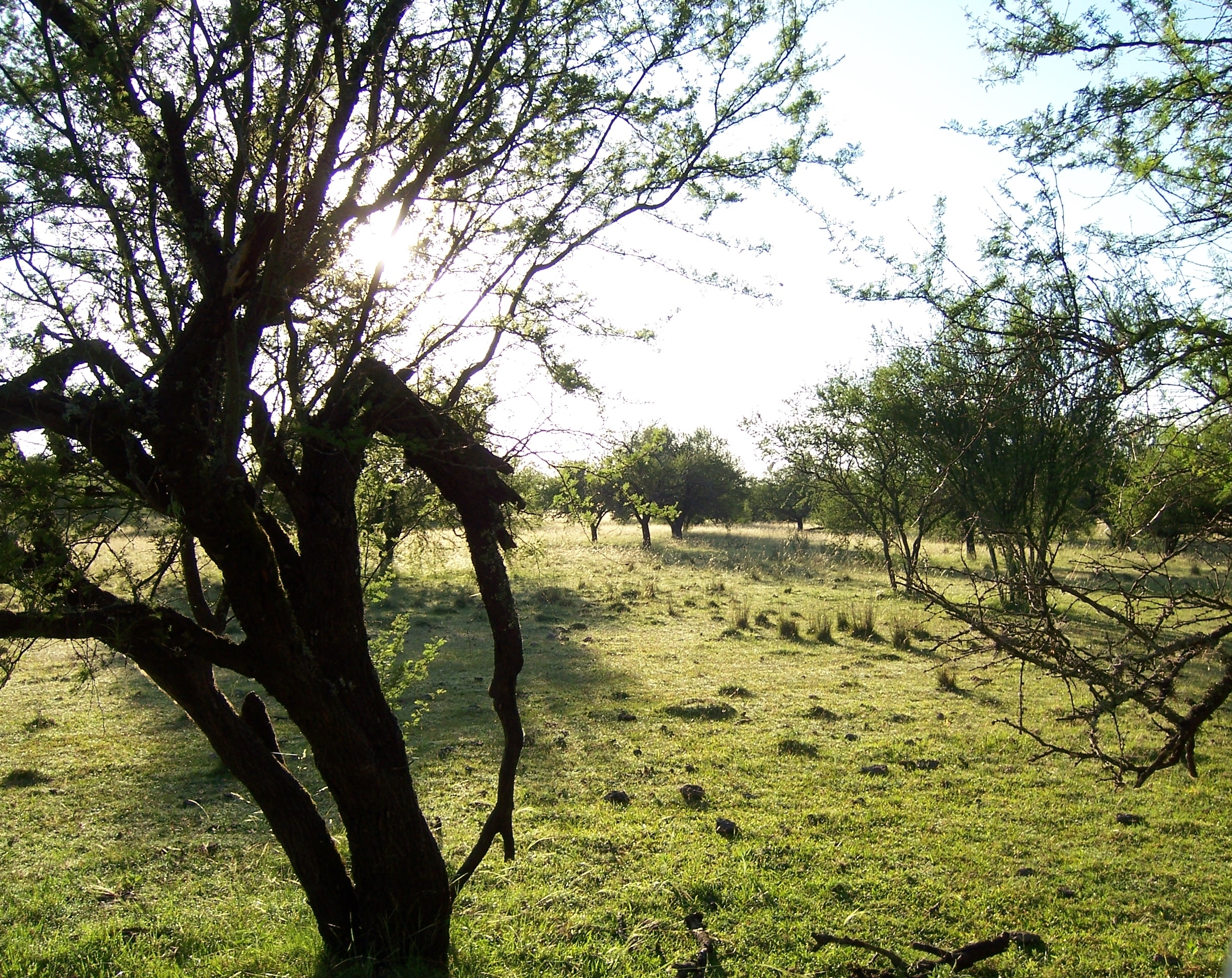
National park, espinillos, Río Queguay

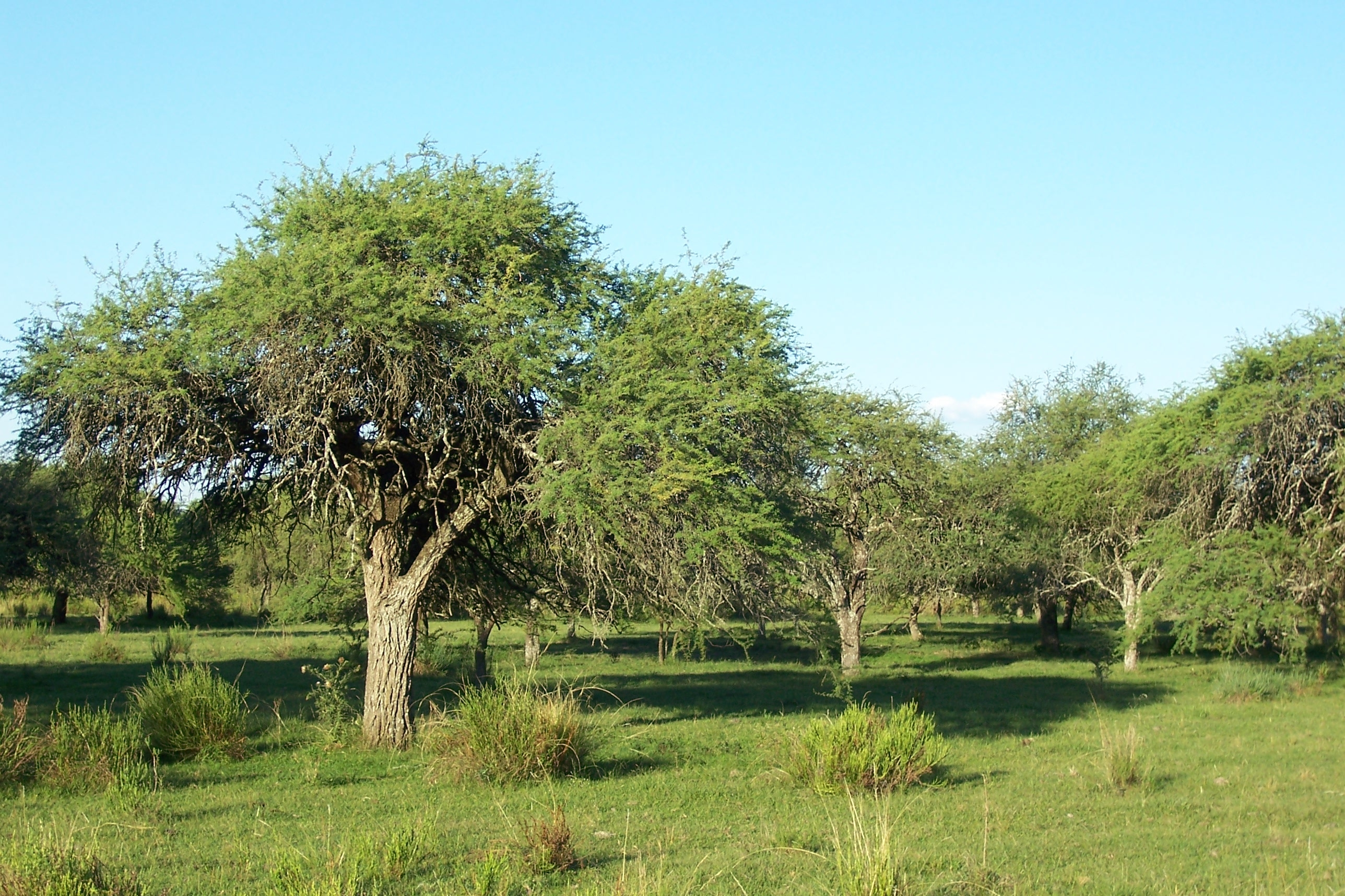
National Park, Prosopis spp.

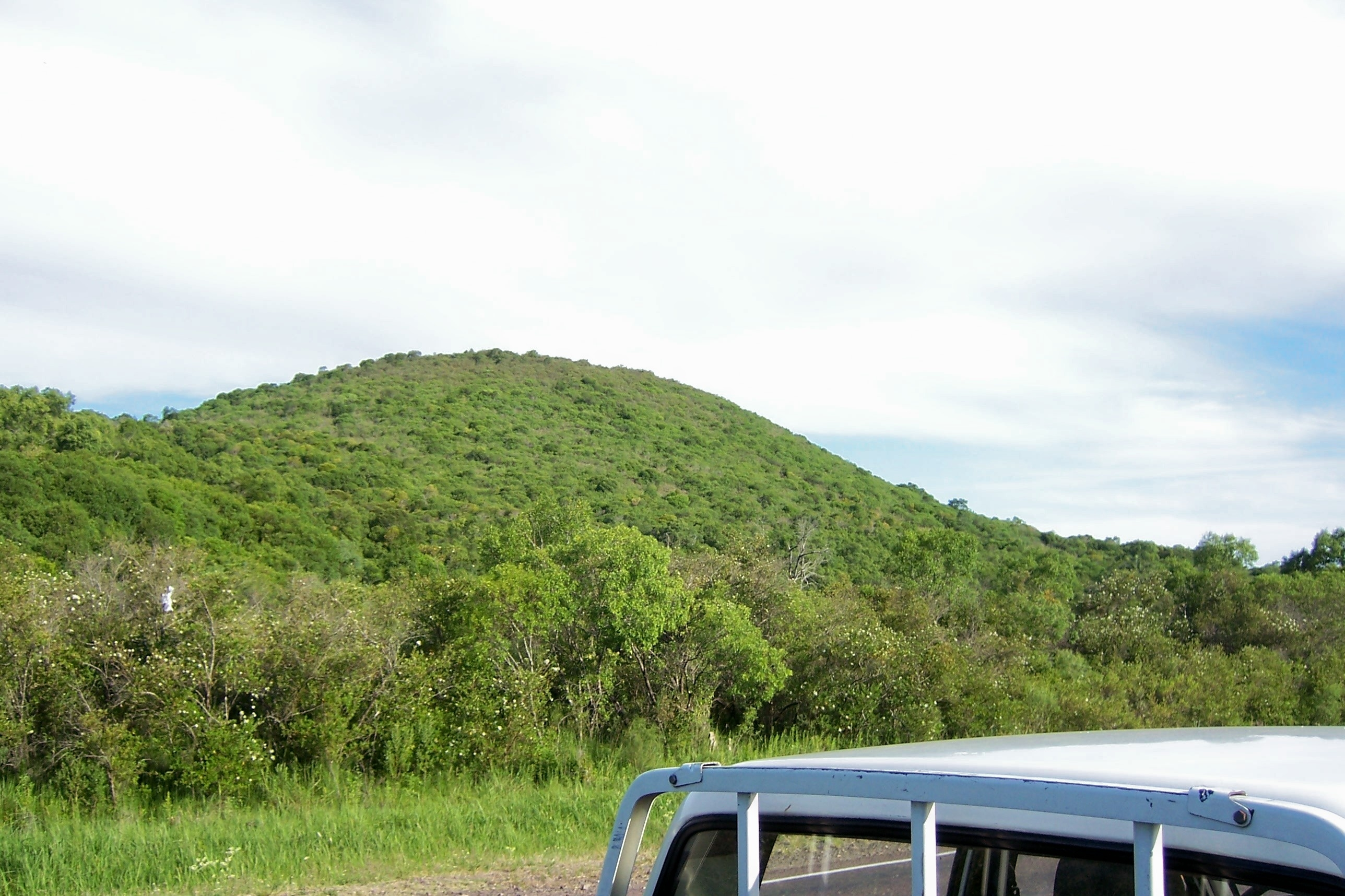
A creek forest, near Valle Edén

== See also ==
- Fauna of Uruguay
- Funga of Uruguay
- Uruguayan savanna
