= D. nanus =

D. nanus may refer to:

- Dendrocopos nanus, the brown-capped woodpecker, a bird species found in Pakistan, India and Sri Lanka
- Dendropsophus nanus, a frog species found in Argentina, Bolivia, Brazil, Paraguay and Uruguay

== See also ==
- Nanus (disambiguation)
