= Funga of Uruguay =

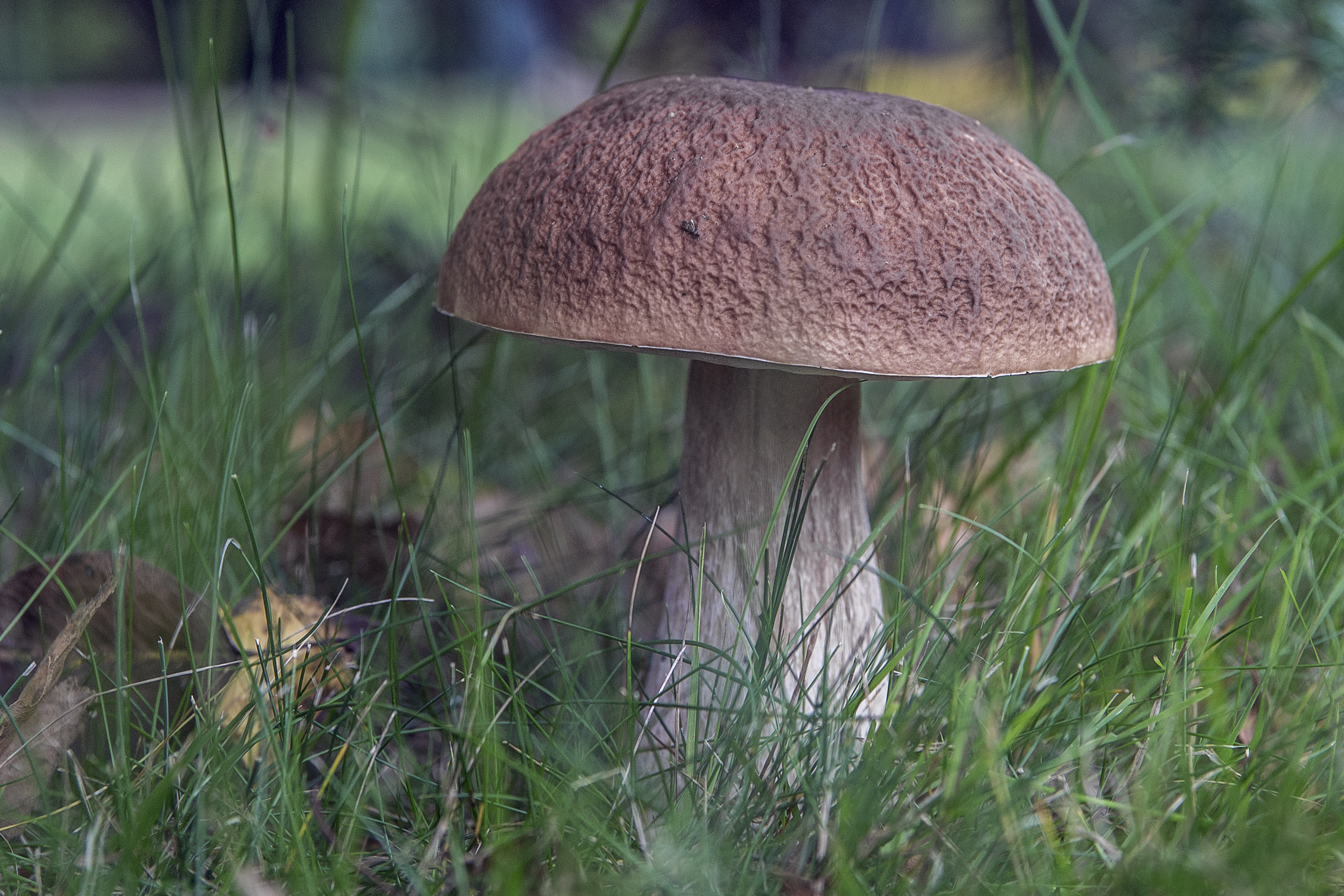
"Porcini criollo" (Boletus edulis).

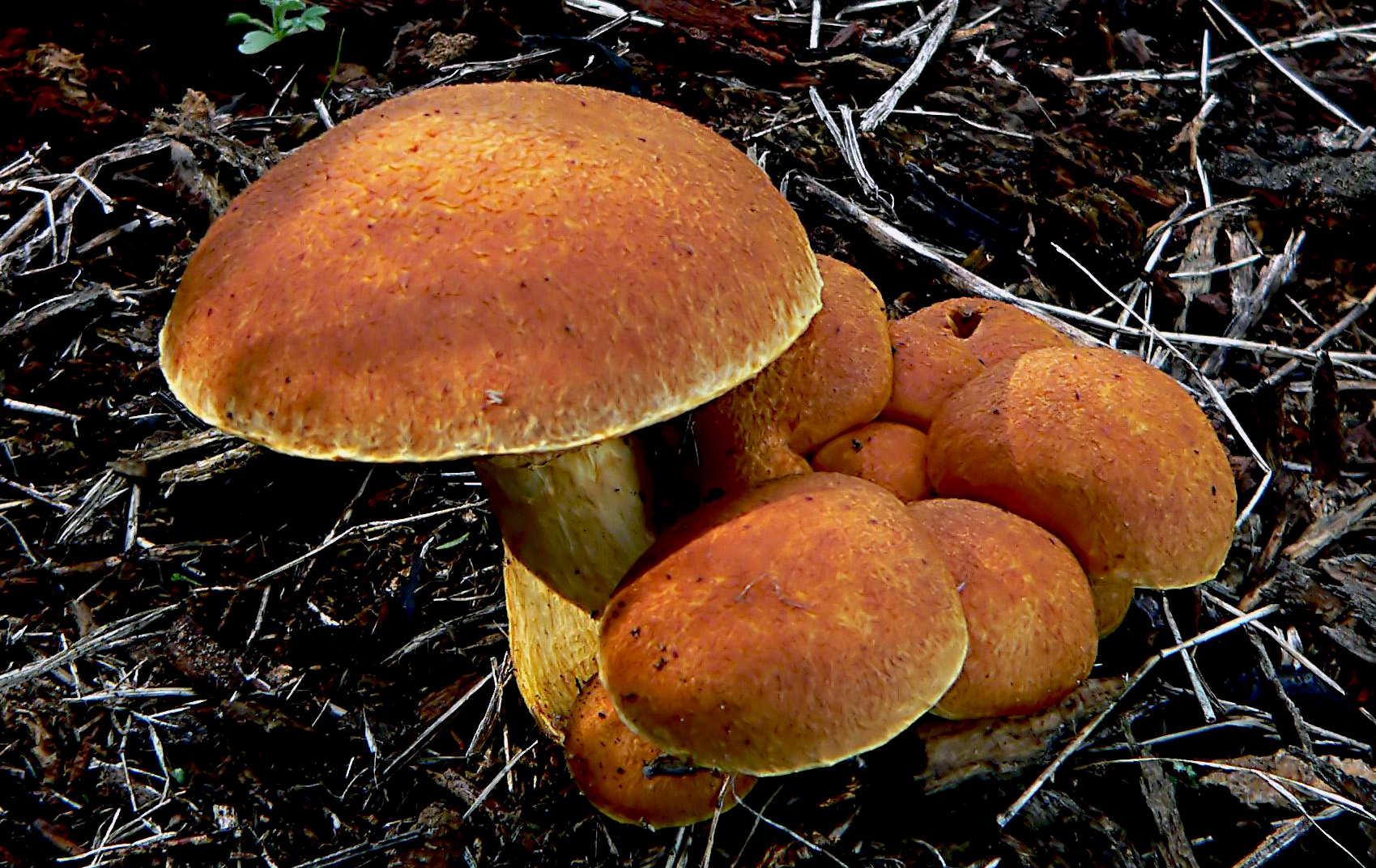
"Hongo de la risa" (Gymnopilus junonius).

The funga of Uruguay consists of various species of fungi and lichens, both endemic and foreign.

In the 2020s, there has been growing interest in studying the local funga from multiple perspectives: ecological, health, culinary, cultural, etc. Furthermore, there have been significant discoveries in the country's fungi, such as recently identified wild truffles, as well as other iconic species from the mushroom kingdom, such as porcini mushrooms, pepper mushrooms, and hygrometric earth stars. Also, mycetazoans and lichens. The country's fungi are being promoted through numerous events, workshops and outdoor activities.

== List of fungi ==
- Boletus edulis
- Gymnopilus junonius
- Lactarius deliciosus
- Laetiporus gilbertsonii
- Laetiporus sulphureus
- Leratiomyces ceres

== List of lichens ==
- Allographa uruguayensis
- Fluctua megapotamica
- Lepraria lobificans
- Leptogium menziesii
- Parmotrema abnuens
- Punctelia canaliculata
- Punctelia constantimontium

== See also ==
- Fauna of Uruguay
- Flora of Uruguay
- Uruguayan savanna
