= List of birds of Uruguay =

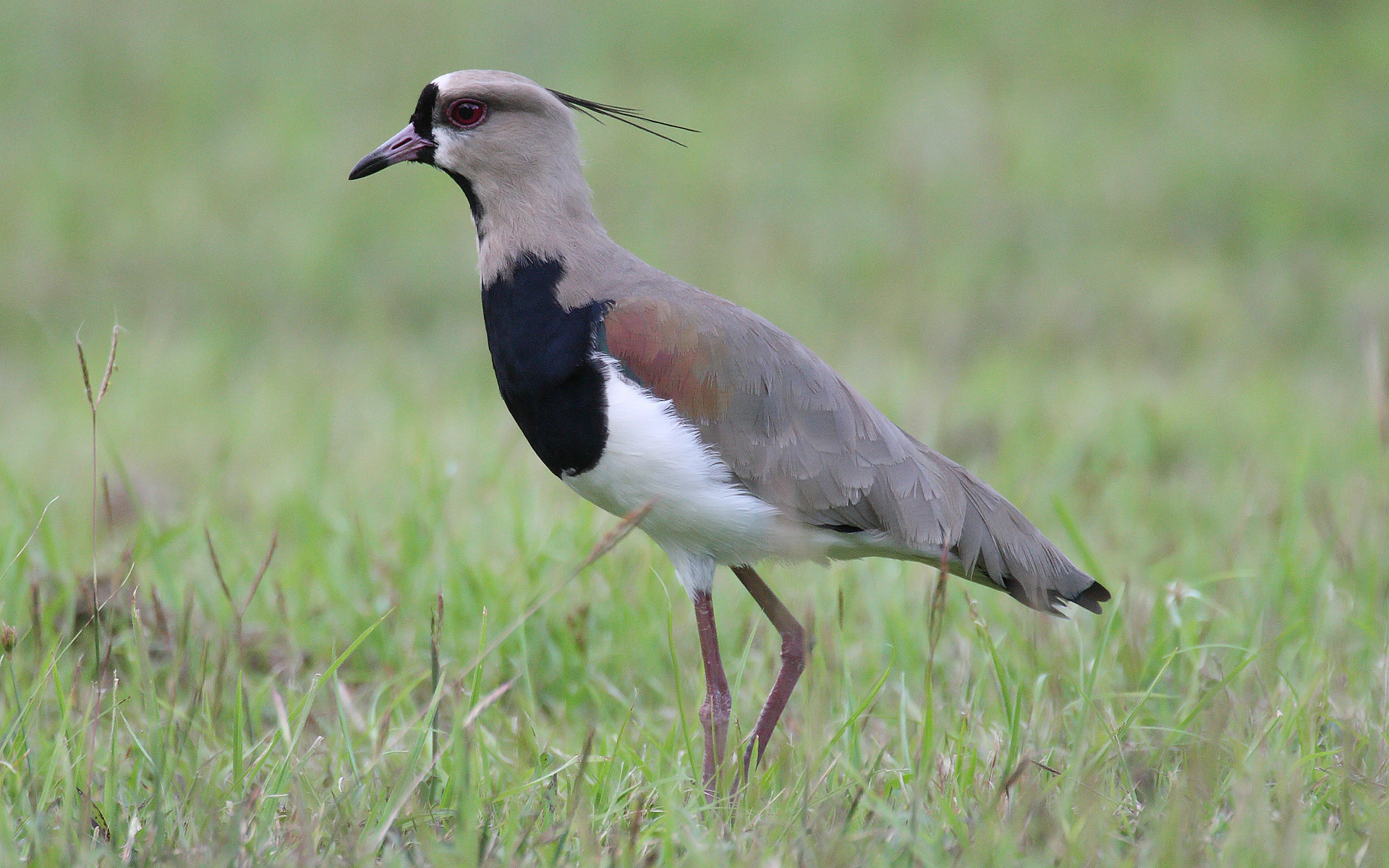
The southern lapwing is the national bird of Uruguay.

This is a list of the bird species recorded in Uruguay. The avifauna of Uruguay has 500 confirmed species, of which nine have been introduced by humans, 75 are rare or vagrants, and four are extirpated or believed extinct. An additional eight species are unconfirmed (see below). None are endemic.

Unless an entry is cited otherwise, the list of species is that of the South American Classification Committee (SACC). Entries from other sources are not included in the above counts. The list's taxonomic treatment (designation and sequence of orders, families, and species) and nomenclature (common and scientific names) are also those of the SACC. Capitalization within English names follows Wikipedia practice, i.e. only the first word of a name is capitalized unless a place name such as São Paulo is used.

The following tags have been used to highlight certain categories of occurrence.

- (V) Vagrant – a species that rarely or accidentally occurs in Uruguay
- (U) Unconfirmed – a species recorded but with "no tangible evidence" according to the SACC
- (I) Introduced – a species introduced to Uruguay as a consequence, direct or indirect, of human actions

== Rheas ==
Order: Rheiformes Family: Rheidae

The rheas are large flightless birds native to South America. Their feet have three toes rather than four which allows them to run faster. One species has been recorded in Uruguay.

- Greater rhea, Rhea americana

== Tinamous ==
Order: Tinamiformes Family: Tinamidae

The tinamous are one of the most ancient groups of bird. Although they look similar to other ground-dwelling birds like quail and grouse, they have no close relatives and are classified as a single family, Tinamidae, within their own order, the Tinamiformes. Three species have been recorded in Uruguay.

- Brown tinamou, Crypturellus obsoletus
- Red-winged tinamou, Rhynchotus rufescens
- Spotted nothura, Nothura maculosa

== Screamers ==
Order: Anseriformes Family: Anhimidae

The screamers are a small family of birds related to the ducks. They are large, bulky birds, with a small downy head, long legs, and large feet which are only partially webbed. They have large spurs on their wings which are used in fights over mates and in territorial disputes. Two species have been recorded in Uruguay.

- Horned screamer, Anhima cornuta (V)
- Southern screamer, Chauna torquata

== Ducks ==
Order: Anseriformes Family: Anatidae

Anatidae includes the ducks and most duck-like waterfowl, such as geese and swans. These birds are adapted to an aquatic existence with webbed feet, flattened bills, and feathers that are excellent at shedding water due to an oily coating. Twenty-three species have been recorded in Uruguay.

- Fulvous whistling-duck, Dendrocygna bicolor
- White-faced whistling-duck, Dendrocygna viduata
- Black-bellied whistling-duck, Dendrocygna autumnalis
- Graylag goose, Anser anser (I)
- Black-necked swan, Cygnus melancoryphus
- Coscoroba swan, Coscoroba coscoroba
- Upland goose, Chloephaga picta (U)
- Muscovy duck, Cairina moschata
- Comb duck, Sarkidiornis sylvicola (V)
- Ringed teal, Callonetta leucophrys
- Brazilian teal, Amazonetta brasiliensis
- Silver teal, Spatula versicolor
- Red shoveler, Spatula platalea
- Blue-winged teal, Spatula discors (V)
- Cinnamon teal, Spatula cyanoptera
- Chiloe wigeon, Mareca sibilatrix
- White-cheeked pintail, Anas bahamensis
- Yellow-billed pintail, Anas georgica
- Yellow-billed teal, Anas flavirostris
- Rosy-billed pochard, Netta peposaca
- Black-headed duck, Heteronetta atricapilla
- Masked duck, Nomonyx dominica
- Lake duck, Oxyura vittata

== Guans ==
Order: Galliformes Family: Cracidae

The Cracidae are large birds, similar in general appearance to turkeys. The guans and curassows live in trees, but the smaller chachalacas are found in more open scrubby habitats. They are generally dull-plumaged, but the curassows and some guans have colorful facial ornaments. Two species have been recorded in Uruguay.

- Dusky-legged guan, Penelope obscura
- Chaco chachalaca, Ortalis canicollis (U)

== New World quails ==
Order: Galliformes Family: Odontophoridae

The New World quails are small, plump terrestrial birds only distantly related to the quails of the Old World, but named for their similar appearance and habits. One species has been recorded in Uruguay.

- Spot-winged wood-quail, Odontophorus capueira (extirpated)

== Flamingos ==
Order: Phoenicopteriformes Family: Phoenicopteridae

Flamingos are gregarious wading birds, usually 3 to 5 feet (0.9 to 1.5 m) tall, found in both the Western and Eastern Hemispheres. Flamingos filter-feed on shellfish and algae. Their oddly shaped beaks are specially adapted to separate mud and silt from the food they consume and are used upside-down. Two species have been recorded in Uruguay.

- Chilean flamingo, Phoenicopterus chilensis
- Andean flamingo, Phoenicoparrus andinus (V)

== Grebes ==
Order: Podicipediformes Family: Podicipedidae

Grebes are small to medium-large freshwater diving birds. They have lobed toes and are excellent swimmers and divers. However, they have their feet placed far back on the body, making them quite ungainly on land. Five species have been recorded in Uruguay.

- White-tufted grebe, Rollandia rolland
- Least grebe, Tachybaptus dominicus
- Pied-billed grebe, Podilymbus podiceps
- Great grebe, Podiceps major
- Silvery grebe, Podiceps occipitalis (V)

== Pigeons ==
Order: Columbiformes Family: Columbidae

Pigeons and doves are stout-bodied birds with short necks and short slender bills with a fleshy cere. Ten species have been recorded in Uruguay.

- Rock pigeon, Columba livia (I)
- Picazuro pigeon, Patagioenas picazuro
- Spot-winged pigeon, Patagioenas maculosa
- Pale-vented pigeon, Patagioenas cayennensis
- Ruddy quail-dove, Geotrygon montana (V)
- White-tipped dove, Leptotila verreauxi
- Gray-fronted dove, Leptotila rufaxilla
- Eared dove, Zenaida auriculata
- Ruddy ground dove, Columbina talpacoti
- Picui ground dove, Columbina picui

== Cuckoos ==
Order: Cuculiformes Family: Cuculidae

The family Cuculidae includes cuckoos, roadrunners, and anis. These birds are of variable size with slender bodies, long tails, and strong legs. Eight species have been recorded in Uruguay.

- Guira cuckoo, Guira guira
- Greater ani, Crotophaga major
- Smooth-billed ani, Crotophaga ani
- Striped cuckoo, Tapera naevia
- Ash-colored cuckoo, Coccycua cinerea
- Squirrel cuckoo, Piaya cayana
- Dark-billed cuckoo, Coccyzus melacoryphus
- Yellow-billed cuckoo, Coccyzus americanus

== Potoos ==
Order: Nyctibiiformes Family: Nyctibiidae

The potoos (sometimes called poor-me-ones) are large near passerine birds related to the nightjars and frogmouths. They are nocturnal insectivores which lack the bristles around the mouth found in the true nightjars. One species has been recorded in Uruguay.

- Common potoo, Nyctibius griseus

== Nightjars ==
Order: Caprimulgiformes Family: Caprimulgidae

Nightjars are medium-sized nocturnal birds that usually nest on the ground. They have long wings, short legs, and very short bills. Most have small feet, of little use for walking, and long pointed wings. Their soft plumage is camouflaged to resemble bark or leaves. Six species have been recorded in Uruguay.

- Nacunda nighthawk, Chordeiles nacunda
- Common nighthawk, Chordeiles minor
- Common pauraque, Nyctidromus albicollis
- Little nightjar, Setopagis parvula
- Scissor-tailed nightjar, Hydropsalis torquata
- Band-winged nightjar, Systellura longirostris

== Swifts ==
Order: Apodiformes Family: Apodidae

Swifts are small birds which spend the majority of their lives flying. These birds have very short legs and never settle voluntarily on the ground, perching instead only on vertical surfaces. Many swifts have long swept-back wings which resemble a crescent or boomerang. Two species have been recorded in Uruguay.

- White-collared swift, Streptoprocne zonaris (V)
- Sick's swift, Chaetura meridionalis (V)

== Hummingbirds ==
Order: Apodiformes Family: Trochilidae

Hummingbirds are small birds capable of hovering in mid-air due to the rapid flapping of their wings. They are the only birds that can fly backwards. Eight species have been recorded in Uruguay.

- Black jacobin, Florisuga fusca
- Black-throated mango, Anthracothorax nigricollis (V)
- Blue-tufted starthroat, Heliomaster furcifer
- Glittering-bellied emerald, Chlorostilbon lucidus
- Violet-capped woodnymph, Thalurania glaucopis (U)
- Swallow-tailed hummingbird, Eupetomena macroura (V)
- White-throated hummingbird, Leucochloris albicollis
- Gilded hummingbird, Hylocharis chrysura

== Limpkin ==
Order: Gruiformes Family: Aramidae

The limpkin resembles a large rail. It has drab-brown plumage and a grayer head and neck.

- Limpkin, Aramus guarauna

== Rails ==
Order: Gruiformes Family: Rallidae

Rallidae is a large family of small to medium-sized birds which includes the rails, crakes, coots, and gallinules. Typically they inhabit dense vegetation in damp environments near lakes, swamps, or rivers. In general they are shy and secretive birds, making them difficult to observe. Most species have strong legs and long toes which are well adapted to soft uneven surfaces. They tend to have short, rounded wings and to be weak fliers. Seventeen species have been recorded in Uruguay.

- Purple gallinule, Porphyrio martinica
- Azure gallinule, Porphyrio flavirostris (V)
- Rufous-sided crake, Laterallus melanophaius
- Red-and-white crake, Laterallus leucopyrrhus
- Speckled rail, Coturnicops notatus
- Ash-throated crake, Mustelirallus albicollis
- Spotted rail, Pardirallus maculatus
- Plumbeous rail, Pardirallus sanguinolentus
- Giant wood-rail, Aramides ypecaha
- Gray-cowled wood-rail, Aramides cajaneus
- Spot-flanked gallinule, Porphyriops melanops
- Yellow-breasted crake, Hapalocrex flaviventer (V)
- Dot-winged crake, Porzana spiloptera
- Common gallinule, Gallinula galeata
- Red-fronted coot, Fulica rufifrons
- Red-gartered coot, Fulica armillata
- White-winged coot, Fulica leucoptera

== Plovers ==
Order: Charadriiformes Family: Charadriidae

The family Charadriidae includes the plovers, dotterels, and lapwings. They are small to medium-sized birds with compact bodies, short thick necks, and long, usually pointed, wings. They are found in open country worldwide, mostly in habitats near water. Eight species have been recorded in Uruguay.

- Black-bellied plover, Pluvialis squatarola
- American golden-plover, Pluvialis dominica
- Tawny-throated dotterel, Oreopholus ruficollis
- Rufous-chested dotterel, Charadrius modestus
- Semipalmated plover, Charadrius semipalmatus
- Southern lapwing, Vanellus chilensis
- Collared plover, Anarynchus collaris
- Two-banded plover, Anarynchus falklandicus

== Oystercatchers ==
Order: Charadriiformes Family: Haematopodidae

The oystercatchers are large and noisy plover-like birds, with strong bills used for smashing or prising open molluscs. Two species have been recorded in Uruguay.

- American oystercatcher, Haematopus palliatus
- Blackish oystercatcher, Haematopus ater (V)

== Avocets and stilts ==
Order: Charadriiformes Family: Recurvirostridae

Recurvirostridae is a family of large wading birds which includes the avocets and stilts. The avocets have long legs and long up-curved bills. The stilts have extremely long legs and long, thin, straight bills. One species has been recorded in Uruguay.

- Black-necked stilt, Himantopus mexicanus

== Sheathbills ==
Order: Charadriiformes Family: Chionididae

The sheathbills are scavengers of the Antarctic regions. They have white plumage and look plump and dove-like but are believed to be similar to the ancestors of the modern gulls and terns. One species has been recorded in Uruguay.

- Snowy sheathbill, Chionis albus

== Magellanic plover ==
Order: Charadriiformes Family: Pluvianellidae

The Magellanic plover is a rare wader found only in southernmost South America. In its build and habits it is similar to a turnstone. Its upperparts and breast are pale gray and the rest of the underparts are white. It has short red legs, a black bill and a red eye. In young birds, the eyes and legs are yellowish.

- Magellanic plover, Pluvianellus socialis (V)

== Sandpipers ==
Order: Charadriiformes Family: Scolopacidae

Scolopacidae is a large diverse family of small to medium-sized shorebirds including the sandpipers, curlews, godwits, shanks, tattlers, woodcocks, snipes, dowitchers, and phalaropes. The majority of these species eat small invertebrates picked out of the mud or soil. Variation in length of legs and bills enables multiple species to feed in the same habitat, particularly on the coast, without direct competition for food. Twenty-four species have been recorded in Uruguay.

- Upland sandpiper, Bartramia longicauda
- Eskimo curlew, Numenius borealis (believed extinct)
- Whimbrel, Numenius phaeopus
- Hudsonian godwit, Limosa haemastica
- Ruddy turnstone, Arenaria interpres
- Red knot, Calidris canutus
- Stilt sandpiper, Calidris himantopus
- Curlew sandpiper, Calidris ferruginea (V)
- Sanderling, Calidris alba
- Baird's sandpiper, Calidris bairdii
- White-rumped sandpiper, Calidris fuscicollis
- Buff-breasted sandpiper, Calidris subruficollis
- Pectoral sandpiper, Calidris melanotos
- Semipalmated sandpiper, Calidris pusilla (V)
- Western sandpiper, Calidris mauri (V)
- Giant snipe, Gallinago undulata (U)
- Pantanal snipe, Gallinago paraguaiae
- Magellanic snipe, Gallinago magellanica
- Wilson's phalarope, Phalaropus tricolor
- Spotted sandpiper, Actitis macularius
- Solitary sandpiper, Tringa solitaria
- Greater yellowlegs, Tringa melanoleuca
- Willet, Tringa semipalmata
- Lesser yellowlegs, Tringa flavipes

== Seedsnipes ==
Order: Charadriiformes Family: Thinocoridae

The seedsnipes are a small family of birds that resemble sparrows. They have short legs and long wings and are herbivorous waders. One species has been recorded in Uruguay.

- Least seedsnipe, Thinocorus rumicivorus

== Jacanas ==
Order: Charadriiformes Family: Jacanidae

The jacanas are a group of waders found throughout the tropics. They are identifiable by their huge feet and claws which enable them to walk on floating vegetation in the shallow lakes that are their preferred habitat. One species has been recorded in Uruguay.

- Wattled jacana, Jacana jacana

== Painted-snipes ==
Order: Charadriiformes Family: Rostratulidae

Painted-snipes are short-legged, long-billed birds similar in shape to the true snipes, but more brightly colored. One species has been recorded in Uruguay.

- South American painted-snipe, Nycticryphes semicollaris

== Skuas ==
Order: Charadriiformes Family: Stercorariidae

The family Stercorariidae are, in general, medium to large birds, typically with gray or brown plumage, often with white markings on the wings. They nest on the ground in temperate and arctic regions and are long-distance migrants. Six species have been recorded in Uruguay.

- Chilean skua, Stercorarius chilensis (V)
- South polar skua, Stercorarius maccormicki
- Brown skua, Stercorarius antarcticus
- Pomarine jaeger, Stercorarius pomarinus
- Parasitic jaeger, Stercorarius parasiticus
- Long-tailed jaeger, Stercorarius longicaudus

== Gulls ==
Order: Charadriiformes Family: Laridae

Laridae is a family of medium to large seabirds and includes gulls, kittiwakes, and terns. Gulls are typically gray or white, often with black markings on the head or wings. They have longish bills and webbed feet. Terns are a group of generally medium to large seabirds typically with gray or white plumage, often with black markings on the head. Most terns hunt fish by diving but some pick insects off the surface of fresh water. Terns are generally long-lived birds, with several species living in excess of 30 years. Twenty-one species have been recorded in Uruguay.

- Brown noddy, Anous stolidus (U)
- Black skimmer, Rynchops niger
- Brown-hooded gull, Chroicocephalus maculipennis
- Gray-hooded gull, Chroicocephalus cirrocephalus
- Laughing gull, Leucophaeus atricilla (V)
- Franklin's gull, Leucophaeus pipixcan (V)
- Olrog's gull, Larus atlanticus
- Kelp gull, Larus dominicanus
- Least tern, Sternula antillarum (V)
- Yellow-billed tern, Sternula superciliaris
- Large-billed tern, Phaetusa simplex
- Gull-billed tern, Gelochelidon nilotica
- Black tern, Chlidonias niger (V)
- Common tern, Sterna hirundo
- Arctic tern, Sterna paradisaea (V)
- South American tern, Sterna hirundinacea
- Antarctic tern, Sterna vittata
- Snowy-crowned tern, Sterna trudeaui
- Elegant tern, Thalasseus elegans (V)
- Sandwich tern, Thalasseus sandvicensis
- Royal tern, Thalasseus maximus

== Penguins ==
Order: Sphenisciformes Family: Spheniscidae

The penguins are a group of aquatic, flightless birds living almost exclusively in the Southern Hemisphere. Most penguins feed on krill, fish, squid, and other forms of sealife caught while swimming underwater. Four species have been recorded in Uruguay.

- King penguin, Aptenodytes patagonicus (V)
- Magellanic penguin, Spheniscus magellanicus
- Macaroni penguin, Eudyptes chrysolophus (V)
- Rockhopper penguin, Eudyptes chrysocome

== Albatrosses ==
Order: Procellariiformes Family: Diomedeidae

The albatrosses are among the largest of flying birds, and the great albatrosses from the genus Diomedea have the largest wingspans of any extant birds. Eight species have been recorded in Uruguay.

- Royal albatross, Diomedea epomophora
- Wandering albatross, Diomedea exulans
- Sooty albatross, Phoebetria fusca (V)
- Yellow-nosed albatross, Thalassarche chlororhynchos
- Black-browed albatross, Thalassarche melanophris
- Gray-headed albatross, Thalassarche chrysostoma (U)
- Buller's albatross, Thalassarche bulleri (V)
- White-capped albatross, Thalassarche cauta

== Southern storm-petrels ==
Order: Procellariiformes Family: Oceanitidae

The storm-petrels are the smallest seabirds, relatives of the petrels, feeding on planktonic crustaceans and small fish picked from the surface, typically while hovering. The flight is fluttering and sometimes bat-like. Until 2018, this family's species were included with the other storm-petrels in family Hydrobatidae. Four species have been recorded in Uruguay.

- White-bellied storm-petrel, Fregetta grallaria (V)
- Black-bellied storm-petrel, Fregetta tropica (V)
- Wilson's storm-petrel, Oceanites oceanicus
- Gray-backed storm-petrel, Garrodia nereis (V)

== Northern storm-petrels ==
Order: Procellariiformes Family: Hydrobatidae

Though the members of this family are similar in many respects to the southern storm-petrels, including their general appearance and habits, there are enough genetic differences to warrant their placement in a separate family. One species has been recorded in Uruguay.

- Leach's storm-petrel, Hydrobates leucorhous (V)

== Shearwaters ==
Order: Procellariiformes Family: Procellariidae

The procellariids are the main group of medium-sized "true petrels", characterised by united nostrils with medium septum and a long outer functional primary. Twenty-one species have been recorded in Uruguay.

- Southern giant-petrel, Macronectes giganteus
- Northern giant-petrel, Macronectes halli
- Southern fulmar, Fulmarus glacialoides
- Pintado petrel, Daption capense
- Kerguelen petrel, Aphrodroma brevirostris (V)
- Great-winged petrel, Pterodroma macroptera (V)
- Soft-plumaged petrel, Pterodroma mollis
- Atlantic petrel, Pterodroma incerta
- Trindade petrel, Pterodroma arminjoniana (V)
- Blue petrel, Halobaena caerulea (V)
- Antarctic prion, Pachyptila desolata
- Slender-billed prion, Pachyptila belcheri
- Gray petrel, Procellaria cinerea (V)
- White-chinned petrel, Procellaria aequinoctialis
- Spectacled petrel, Procellaria conspicillata
- Cory's shearwater, Calonectris diomedea
- Cape Verde shearwater, Calonectris edwardsii
- Sooty shearwater, Ardenna griseus
- Great shearwater, Ardenna gravis
- Manx shearwater, Puffinus puffinus
- Common diving-petrel, Pelecanoides urinatrix (V)

== Storks ==
Order: Ciconiiformes Family: Ciconiidae

Storks are large, long-legged, long-necked, wading birds with long, stout bills. Storks are mute, but bill-clattering is an important mode of communication at the nest. Their nests can be large and may be reused for many years. Many species are migratory. Three species have been recorded in Uruguay.

- Maguari stork, Ciconia maguari
- Jabiru, Jabiru mycteria (V)
- Wood stork, Mycteria americana

== Frigatebirds ==
Order: Suliformes Family: Fregatidae

Frigatebirds are large seabirds usually found over tropical oceans. They are large, black-and-white, or completely black, with long wings and deeply forked tails. The males have colored inflatable throat pouches. They do not swim or walk and cannot take off from a flat surface. Having the largest wingspan-to-body-weight ratio of any bird, they are essentially aerial, able to stay aloft for more than a week. One species has been recorded in Uruguay.

- Magnificent frigatebird, Fregata magnificens

== Boobies ==
Order: Suliformes Family: Sulidae

The sulids comprise the gannets and boobies. Both groups are medium to large coastal seabirds that plunge-dive for fish. Three species have been recorded in Uruguay.

- Cape gannet, Morus capensis (V)
- Masked booby, Sula dactylatra (V)
- Brown booby, Sula leucogaster (V)

== Anhingas ==
Order: Suliformes Family: Anhingidae

Anhingas are often called "snake-birds" because of their long thin neck, which gives a snake-like appearance when they swim with their bodies submerged. The males have black and dark-brown plumage, an erectile crest on the nape, and a larger bill than the female. The females have much paler plumage especially on the neck and underparts. The darters have completely webbed feet and their legs are short and set far back on the body. Their plumage is somewhat permeable, like that of cormorants, and they spread their wings to dry after diving. One species has been recorded in Uruguay.

- Anhinga, Anhinga anhinga

== Cormorants ==
Order: Suliformes Family: Phalacrocoracidae

Phalacrocoracidae is a family of medium to large coastal, fish-eating seabirds that includes cormorants and shags. Plumage coloration varies, with the majority having mainly dark plumage, some species being black-and-white, and a few being colorful. Two species have been recorded in Uruguay.

- Neotropic cormorant, Phalacrocorax brasilianus
- Imperial cormorant, Phalacrocorax atriceps

== Herons ==
Order: Pelecaniformes Family: Ardeidae

The family Ardeidae contains the bitterns, herons, and egrets. Herons and egrets are medium to large wading birds with long necks and legs. Bitterns tend to be shorter necked and more wary. Members of Ardeidae fly with their necks retracted, unlike other long-necked birds such as storks, ibises, and spoonbills. Eleven species have been recorded in Uruguay.

- Rufescent tiger-heron, Tigrisoma lineatum
- Stripe-backed bittern, Ixobrychus involucris
- Pinnated bittern, Botaurus pinnatus
- Whistling heron, Syrigma sibilatrix
- Little blue heron, Egretta caerulea
- Snowy egret, Egretta thula
- Black-crowned night-heron, Nycticorax nycticorax
- Striated heron, Butorides striata
- Cattle egret, Ardea ibis
- Great egret, Ardea alba
- Cocoi heron, Ardea cocoi

== Ibises ==
Order: Pelecaniformes Family: Threskiornithidae

Threskiornithidae is a family of large terrestrial and wading birds which includes the ibises and spoonbills. They have long, broad wings with 11 primary and about 20 secondary feathers. They are strong fliers and despite their size and weight, very capable soarers. Five species have been recorded in Uruguay.

- White-faced ibis, Plegadis chihi
- Bare-faced ibis, Phimosus infuscatus
- Plumbeous ibis, Theristicus caerulescens
- Buff-necked ibis, Theristicus caudatus
- Roseate spoonbill, Platalea ajaja

== New World vultures ==
Order: Cathartiformes Family: Cathartidae

The New World vultures are not closely related to Old World vultures, but superficially resemble them because of convergent evolution. Like the Old World vultures, they are scavengers. However, unlike Old World vultures, which find carcasses by sight, New World vultures have a good sense of smell with which they locate carrion. Three species have been recorded in Uruguay.

- Black vulture, Coragyps atratus
- Turkey vulture, Cathartes aura
- Lesser yellow-headed vulture, Cathartes burrovianus

== Osprey ==
Order: Accipitriformes Family: Pandionidae

The family Pandionidae contains only one species, the osprey. The osprey is a medium-large raptor which is a specialist fish-eater with a worldwide distribution.

- Osprey, Pandion haliaetus

== Hawks ==
Order: Accipitriformes Family: Accipitridae

Accipitridae is a family of birds of prey, which includes hawks, eagles, kites, harriers, and Old World vultures. These birds have powerful hooked beaks for tearing flesh from their prey, strong legs, powerful talons, and keen eyesight. Twenty species have been recorded in Uruguay.

- White-tailed kite, Elanus leucurus
- Swallow-tailed kite, Elanoides forficatus (V)
- Black-collared hawk, Busarellus nigricollis
- Snail kite, Rostrhamus sociabilis
- Mississippi kite, Ictinia mississippiensis (V)
- Sharp-shinned hawk, Accipiter striatus
- Bicolored hawk, Astur bicolor
- Cinereous harrier, Circus cinereus
- Long-winged harrier, Circus buffoni
- Crane hawk, Geranospiza caerulescens
- Savanna hawk, Buteogallus meridionalis
- Great black hawk, Buteogallus urubitinga
- Chaco eagle, Buteogallus coronatus (Extirpated)
- Roadside hawk, Rupornis magnirostris
- Harris's hawk, Parabuteo unicinctus
- White-tailed hawk, Geranoaetus albicaudatus
- Variable hawk, Geranoaetus polyosoma
- Black-chested buzzard-eagle, Geranoaetus melanoleucus
- Short-tailed hawk, Buteo brachyurus (V)
- Swainson's hawk, Buteo swainsoni

== Barn owls ==
Order: Strigiformes Family: Tytonidae

Barn owls are medium to large owls with large heads and heart-shaped faces. They have long strong legs with powerful talons. One species has been recorded in Uruguay.

- American barn owl, Tyto furcata

== Owls ==
Order: Strigiformes Family: Strigidae

The typical owls are small to large solitary nocturnal birds of prey. They have large forward-facing eyes and ears, a hawk-like beak, and a conspicuous circle of feathers around each eye called a facial disk. Eight species have been recorded in Uruguay.

- Tropical screech-owl, Megascops choliba
- Long-tufted screech-owl, Megascops sanctaecatarinae
- Tropical horned owl, Bubo nacurutu
- Ferruginous pygmy-owl, Glaucidium brasilianum
- Burrowing owl, Athene cunicularia
- Buff-fronted owl, Aegolius harrisii
- Striped owl, Asio clamator
- Short-eared owl, Asio flammeus

== Trogons ==
Order: Trogoniformes Family: Trogonidae

The family Trogonidae includes trogons and quetzals. Found in tropical woodlands worldwide, they feed on insects and fruit, and their broad bills and weak legs reflect their diet and arboreal habits. Although their flight is fast, they are reluctant to fly any distance. Trogons have soft, often colorful, feathers with distinctive male and female plumage. One species has been recorded in Uruguay.

- Surucua trogon, Trogon surrucura

== Kingfishers ==
Order: Coraciiformes Family: Alcedinidae

Kingfishers are medium-sized birds with large heads, long pointed bills, short legs, and stubby tails. Three species have been recorded in Uruguay.

- Ringed kingfisher, Megaceryle torquata
- Amazon kingfisher, Chloroceryle amazona
- Green kingfisher, Chloroceryle americana

== Toucans ==
Order: Piciformes Family: Ramphastidae

Toucans are near passerine birds from the neotropics. They are brightly marked and have enormous, colorful bills which in some species amount to half their body length. One species has been recorded in Uruguay.

- Toco toucan, Ramphastos toco

== Woodpeckers ==
Order: Piciformes Family: Picidae

Woodpeckers are small to medium-sized birds with chisel-like beaks, short legs, stiff tails, and long tongues used for capturing insects. Some species have feet with two toes pointing forward and two backward, while several species have only three toes. Many woodpeckers have the habit of tapping noisily on tree trunks with their beaks. Ten species have been recorded in Uruguay.

- White-barred piculet, Picumnus cirratus
- Mottled piculet, Picumnus nebulosus
- White woodpecker, Melanerpes candidus
- White-fronted woodpecker, Melanerpes cactorum
- White-spotted woodpecker, Dryobates spilogaster
- Checkered woodpecker, Dryobates mixtus
- Cream-backed woodpecker, Campephilus leucopogon
- White-browed woodpecker, Piculus aurulentus
- Green-barred woodpecker, Colaptes melanochloros
- Campo flicker, Colaptes campestris

== Seriemas ==
Order: Cariamiformes Family: Cariamidae

The seriemas are terrestrial birds which run rather than fly (though they are able to fly for short distances). They have long legs, necks, and tails, but only short wings, reflecting their way of life. They are brownish birds with short bills and erectile crests, found on fairly-dry open grasslands. One species has been recorded in Uruguay.

- Red-legged seriema, Cariama cristata

== Falcons ==
Order: Falconiformes Family: Falconidae

Falconidae is a family of diurnal birds of prey. They differ from hawks, eagles, and kites in that they kill with their beaks instead of their talons. Seven species have been recorded in Uruguay.

- Spot-winged falconet, Spiziapteryx circumcincta (U)
- Crested caracara, Caracara plancus
- Yellow-headed caracara, Milvago chimachima
- Chimango caracara, Milvago chimango
- American kestrel, Falco sparverius
- Aplomado falcon, Falco femoralis
- Peregrine falcon, Falco peregrinus

== New World and African parrots ==
Order: Psittaciformes Family: Psittacidae

Parrots are small to large birds with a characteristic curved beak. Their upper mandibles have slight mobility in the joint with the skull and they have a generally erect stance. All parrots are zygodactyl, having the four toes on each foot placed two at the front and two to the back. Eight species have been recorded in Uruguay.

- Monk parakeet, Myiopsitta monachus
- Maroon-bellied parakeet, Pyrrhura frontalis
- Burrowing parakeet, Cyanoliseus patagonus
- Glaucous macaw, Anodorhynchus glaucus (believed extinct)
- Nanday parakeet, Aratinga nenday (I)
- Blue-crowned parakeet, Thectocercus acuticaudatus
- Mitred parakeet, Psittacara mitratus (I)
- White-eyed parakeet, Psittacara leucophthalmus

== Antbirds ==
Order: Passeriformes Family: Thamnophilidae

The antbirds are a large family of small passerine birds of subtropical and tropical Central and South America. They are forest birds which tend to feed on insects at or near the ground. A sizable minority of them specialize in following columns of army ants to eat small invertebrates that leave their hiding places to flee from the ants. Many species lack bright color; brown, black, and white are the dominant tones. Four species have been recorded in Uruguay.

- Large-tailed antshrike, Mackenziaena leachii
- Great antshrike, Taraba major
- Rufous-capped antshrike, Thamnophilus ruficapillus (V)
- Variable antshrike, Thamnophilus caerulescens

== Gnateaters ==
Order: Passeriformes Family: Conopophagidae

The gnateaters are round, short-tailed, and long-legged birds which are closely related to the antbirds. One species has been recorded in Uruguay.

- Rufous gnateater, Conopophaga lineata

== Ovenbirds ==
Order: Passeriformes Family: Furnariidae

Ovenbirds comprise a large family of small sub-oscine passerine bird species found in Central and South America. They are a diverse group of insectivores which gets its name from the elaborate "oven-like" clay nests built by some species, although others build stick nests or nest in tunnels or clefts in rock. The woodcreepers are brownish birds which maintain an upright vertical posture, supported by their stiff tail vanes. They feed mainly on insects taken from tree trunks. Thirty-five species have been recorded in Uruguay. Three species are migratory and reach Uruguayan territory in winter.

- Common miner, Geositta cunicularia
- Olivaceous woodcreeper, Sittasomus griseicapillus
- Planalto woodcreeper, Dendrocolaptes platyrostris
- Scimitar-billed woodcreeper, Drymornis bridgesii
- Narrow-billed woodcreeper, Lepidocolaptes angustirostris
- Scalloped woodcreeper, Lepidocolaptes falcinellus
- Rufous hornero, Furnarius rufus
- Sharp-tailed streamcreeper, Lochmias nematura
- Wren-like rushbird, Phleocryptes melanops
- Curve-billed reedhaunter, Limnornis curvirostris
- Scale-throated earthcreeper, Upucerthia dumetaria (U)
- Buff-winged cinclodes, Cinclodes fuscus
- Sharp-billed treehunter, Heliobletus contaminatus
- Buff-browed foliage-gleaner, Syndactyla rufosuperciliata
- Tufted tit-spinetail, Leptasthenura platensis
- Little thornbird, Phacellodomus sibilatrix
- Freckle-breasted thornbird, Phacellodomus striaticollis
- Greater thornbird, Phacellodomus ruber
- Orange-breasted thornbird, Phacellodomus ferrugineigula
- Firewood-gatherer, Anumbius annumbi
- Lark-like brushrunner, Coryphistera alaudina
- Short-billed canastero, Asthenes baeri
- Hudson's canastero, Asthenes hudsoni
- Sharp-billed canastero, Asthenes pyrrholeuca
- Straight-billed reedhaunter, Limnoctites rectirostris
- Sulphur-bearded reedhaunter, Limnoctites sulphuriferus
- Stripe-crowned spinetail, Cranioleuca pyrrhophia
- Bay-capped wren-spinetail, Spartonoica maluroides
- Brown cacholote, Pseudoseisura lophotes
- Yellow-chinned spinetail, Certhiaxis cinnamomeus
- Chotoy spinetail, Schoeniophylax phryganophila
- Gray-bellied spinetail, Synallaxis cinerascens
- Spix's spinetail, Synallaxis spixi
- Pale-breasted spinetail, Synallaxis albescens
- Sooty-fronted spinetail, Synallaxis frontalis

== Cotingas ==
Order: Passeriformes Family: Cotingidae

The cotingas are birds of forests or forest edges in tropical South America. Comparatively little is known about this diverse group, although all have broad bills with hooked tips, rounded wings and strong legs. The males of many of the species are brightly colored, or decorated with plumes or wattles. Two species have been recorded in Uruguay.

- White-tipped plantcutter, Phytotoma rutila
- Red-ruffed fruitcrow, Pyroderus scutatus (V)

== Tityras ==
Order: Passeriformes Family: Tityridae

Tityridae are suboscine passerine birds found in forest and woodland in the Neotropics. The species in this family were formerly spread over the families Tyrannidae, Pipridae, and Cotingidae. They are small to medium-sized birds. They do not have the sophisticated vocal capabilities of the songbirds. Most, but not all, have plain coloring. Four species have been recorded in Uruguay.

- White-naped xenopsaris, Xenopsaris albinucha
- Green-backed becard, Pachyramphus viridis
- White-winged becard, Pachyramphus polychopterus
- Crested becard, Pachyramphus validus

== Tyrant flycatchers ==
Order: Passeriformes Family: Tyrannidae

Tyrant flycatchers are passerine birds which occur throughout North and South America. They superficially resemble the Old World flycatchers, but are more robust and have stronger bills. They do not have the sophisticated vocal capabilities of the songbirds. Most, but not all, have plain coloring. As the name implies, most are insectivorous. Sixty-four species have been recorded in Uruguay.

- Mottle-cheeked tyrannulet, Phylloscartes ventralis
- Sepia-capped flycatcher, Leptopogon amaurocephalus (V)
- Yellow-olive flatbill, Tolmomyias sulphurescens
- Pearly-vented tody-tyrant, Hemitriccus margaritaceiventer
- Ochre-faced tody-flycatcher, Poecilotriccus plumbeiceps
- Cliff flycatcher, Hirundinea ferruginea
- Fulvous-crowned scrub-tyrant, Euscarthmus meloryphus
- Yellow-bellied elaenia, Elaenia flavogaster (V)
- Large elaenia, Elaenia spectabilis
- White-crested elaenia, Elaenia albiceps
- Small-billed elaenia, Elaenia parvirostris
- Olivaceous elaenia, Elaenia mesoleuca
- Small-headed elaenia, Elaenia sordida
- Greenish elaenia, Myiopagis viridicata
- Suiriri flycatcher, Suiriri suiriri
- Greenish tyrannulet, Phyllomyias virescens (V)
- Rough-legged tyrannulet, Acrochordopus burmeisteri (V)
- Southeastern beardless-tyrannulet, Camptostoma obsoletum
- Yellow-billed tit-tyrant, Anairetes flavirostris (V)
- Bearded tachuri, Polystictus pectoralis
- Sharp-tailed tyrant, Culicivora caudacuta
- Crested doradito, Pseudocolopteryx sclateri
- Warbling doradito, Pseudocolopteryx flaviventris
- Sooty tyrannulet, Serpophaga nigricans
- White-crested tyrannulet, Serpophaga subcristata
- Straneck's tyrannulet, Serpophaga griseicapilla
- Piratic flycatcher, Legatus leucophaius (V)
- Great kiskadee, Pitangus sulphuratus
- Cattle tyrant, Machetornis rixosa
- Boat-billed flycatcher, Megarynchus pitangua
- Streaked flycatcher, Myiodynastes maculatus
- Variegated flycatcher, Empidonomus varius
- Crowned slaty flycatcher, Empidonomus aurantioatrocristatus
- Tropical kingbird, Tyrannus melancholicus
- Fork-tailed flycatcher, Tyrannus savana
- Eastern kingbird, Tyrannus tyrannus (V)
- Rufous casiornis, Casiornis rufus
- Swainson's flycatcher, Myiarchus swainsoni
- Short-crested flycatcher, Myiarchus ferox
- Brown-crested flycatcher, Myiarchus tyrannulus
- Bran-colored flycatcher, Myiophobus fasciatus
- Southern scrub-flycatcher, Sublegatus modestus
- Vermilion flycatcher, Pyrocephalus rubinus
- Black-backed water-tyrant, Fluvicola albiventer
- Masked water-tyrant, Fluvicola nengeta (V)
- White-headed marsh tyrant, Arundinicola leucocephala (V)
- Streamer-tailed tyrant, Gubernetes yetapa (V)
- Strange-tailed tyrant, Alectrurus risora (V)
- Austral negrito, Lessonia rufa
- Spectacled tyrant, Hymenops perspicillatus
- Crested black-tyrant, Knipolegus lophotes
- Blue-billed black-tyrant, Knipolegus cyanirostris
- Yellow-browed tyrant, Satrapa icterophrys
- Dark-faced ground-tyrant, Muscisaxicola maclovianus
- White-browed ground-tyrant, Muscisaxicola albilora (V)
- White monjita, Xolmis irupero
- Gray monjita, Nengetus cinereus
- Black-crowned monjita, Neoxolmis coronatus
- Chocolate-vented tyrant, Neoxolmis rufiventris
- Black-and-white monjita, Heteroxolmis dominicana
- Gray-bellied shrike-tyrant, Agriornis micropterus (V)
- Lesser shrike-tyrant, Agriornis murinus (V)
- Fuscous flycatcher, Cnemotriccus fuscatus
- Euler's flycatcher, Lathrotriccus euleri
- Many-colored rush tyrant, Tachuris rubrigastra

== Vireos ==
Order: Passeriformes Family: Vireonidae

The vireos are a group of small to medium-sized passerine birds. They are typically greenish in color and resemble wood warblers apart from their heavier bills. Two species have been recorded in Uruguay.

- Rufous-browed peppershrike, Cyclarhis gujanensis
- Chivi vireo, Vireo chivi

== Jays ==
Order: Passeriformes Family: Corvidae

The family Corvidae includes crows, ravens, jays, choughs, magpies, treepies, nutcrackers, and ground jays. Corvids are above average in size among the Passeriformes, and some of the larger species show high levels of intelligence. Three species have been recorded in Uruguay.

- Purplish jay, Cyanocorax cyanomelas (V)
- Azure jay, Cyanocorax caeruleus
- Plush-crested jay, Cyanocorax chrysops

== Swallows ==
Order: Passeriformes Family: Hirundinidae

The family Hirundinidae is adapted to aerial feeding. They have a slender streamlined body, long pointed wings, and a short bill with a wide gape. The feet are adapted to perching rather than walking, and the front toes are partially joined at the base. Eleven species have been recorded in Uruguay.

- Blue-and-white swallow, Pygochelidon cyanoleuca
- Tawny-headed swallow, Alopochelidon fucata
- Southern rough-winged swallow, Stelgidopteryx ruficollis
- Brown-chested martin, Progne tapera
- Gray-breasted martin, Progne chalybea
- Southern martin, Progne elegans
- White-rumped swallow, Tachycineta leucorrhoa
- Chilean swallow, Tachycineta leucopyga
- Bank swallow, Riparia riparia (V)
- Barn swallow, Hirundo rustica
- Cliff swallow, Petrochelidon pyrrhonota

== Wrens ==
Order: Passeriformes Family: Troglodytidae

The wrens are mainly small and inconspicuous except for their loud songs. These birds have short wings and thin down-turned bills. Several species often hold their tails upright. All are insectivorous. Two species have been recorded in Uruguay.

- Southern house-wren, Troglodytes musculus
- Grass wren, Cistothorus platensis

== Gnatcatchers ==
Order: Passeriformes Family: Polioptilidae

These dainty birds resemble Old World warblers in their build and habits, moving restlessly through the foliage seeking insects. The gnatcatchers and gnatwrens are mainly soft bluish gray in color and have the typical insectivore's long sharp bill. They are birds of fairly open woodland or scrub which nest in bushes or trees. One species has been recorded in Uruguay.

- Masked gnatcatcher, Polioptila dumicola

== Thrushes ==
Order: Passeriformes Family: Turdidae

The thrushes are a group of passerine birds that occur mainly in the Old World. They are plump, soft plumaged, small to medium-sized insectivores or sometimes omnivores, often feeding on the ground. Many have attractive songs. Seven species have been recorded in Uruguay.

- Swainson's thrush, Catharus ustulatus (V)
- Yellow-legged thrush, Turdus flavipes (V)
- Pale-breasted thrush, Turdus leucomelas
- Rufous-bellied thrush, Turdus rufiventris
- Creamy-bellied thrush, Turdus amaurochalinus
- Blacksmith thrush, Turdus subalaris
- Rufous-flanked thrush, Turdus albicollis

== Mockingbirds ==
Order: Passeriformes Family: Mimidae

The mimids are a family of passerine birds that includes thrashers, mockingbirds, tremblers, and the New World catbirds. These birds are notable for their vocalizations, especially their ability to mimic a wide variety of birds and other sounds heard outdoors. Their coloring tends towards dull-grays and browns. Two species have been recorded in Uruguay.

- Chalk-browed mockingbird, Mimus saturninus
- White-banded mockingbird, Mimus triurus

== Starlings ==
Order: Passeriformes Family: Sturnidae

Starlings are small to medium-sized passerine birds. Their flight is strong and direct and they are very gregarious. Their preferred habitat is fairly open country. They eat insects and fruit. Plumage is typically dark with a metallic sheen. One species has been recorded in Uruguay.

- European starling, Sturnus vulgaris (I)

== Estreldids ==
Order: Passeriformes Family: Estrildidae

The estrildid finches are small passerine birds of the Old World tropics and Australasia. They are gregarious and often colonial seed eaters with short thick but pointed bills. They are all similar in structure and habits, but have a wide variation in plumage colors and patterns. One species has been recorded in Uruguay.

- Common waxbill, Estrilda astrild (I)

== Old World sparrows ==
Order: Passeriformes Family: Passeridae

Sparrows are small passerine birds. sparrows tend to be small, plump, brown or gray birds with short tails and short powerful beaks. Sparrows are seed eaters, but they also consume small insects. One species has been recorded in Uruguay.

- House sparrow, Passer domesticus (I)

== Pipits and wagtails ==
Order: Passeriformes Family: Motacillidae

Motacillidae is a family of small passerine birds with medium to long tails. They include the wagtails, longclaws, and pipits. They are slender ground-feeding insectivores of open country. Six species have been recorded in Uruguay.

- White wagtail, Motacilla alba (V)
- Yellowish pipit, Anthus chii
- Short-billed pipit, Anthus furcatus
- Correndera pipit, Anthus correndera
- Ochre-breasted pipit, Anthus nattereri
- Hellmayr's pipit, Anthus hellmayri

== Finches ==
Order: Passeriformes Family: Fringillidae

Finches are seed-eating passerine birds that are small to moderately large and have a strong beak, usually conical and in some species very large. All have twelve tail feathers and nine primaries. These birds have a bouncing flight with alternating bouts of flapping and gliding on closed wings, and most sing well. Six species have been recorded in Uruguay.

- European greenfinch, Chloris chloris (I)
- European goldfinch, Carduelis carduelis (I)
- Hooded siskin, Spinus magellanicus
- Blue-naped chlorophonia, Chlorophonia cyanea
- Golden-rumped euphonia, Chlorophonia cyanocephala
- Purple-throated euphonia, Euphonia chlorotica

== Sparrows ==
Order: Passeriformes Family: Passerellidae

Most of the species are known as sparrows, but these birds are not closely related to the Old World sparrows which are in the family Passeridae. Many of these have distinctive head patterns. Two species have been recorded in Uruguay.

- Grassland sparrow, Ammodramus humeralis
- Rufous-collared sparrow, Zonotrichia capensis

== Blackbirds ==
Order: Passeriformes Family: Icteridae

The icterids are a group of small to medium-sized, often colorful, passerine birds restricted to the New World and include the grackles, New World blackbirds, and New World orioles. Most species have black as the predominant plumage color, often enlivened by yellow, orange, or red. Eighteen species have been recorded in Uruguay.

- Bobolink, Dolichonyx oryzivorus (V)
- White-browed meadowlark, Leistes superciliaris
- Pampas meadowlark, Leistes defilippii
- Solitary black cacique, Cacicus solitarius
- Golden-winged cacique, Cacicus chrysopterus
- Red-rumped cacique, Cacicus haemorrhous
- Variable oriole, Icterus pyrrhopterus
- Screaming cowbird, Molothrus rufoaxillaris
- Shiny cowbird, Molothrus bonariensis
- Scarlet-headed blackbird, Amblyramphus holosericeus
- Chopi blackbird, Gnorimopsar chopi
- Grayish baywing, Agelaioides badius
- Unicolored blackbird, Agelasticus cyanopus
- Yellow-winged blackbird, Agelasticus thilius
- Chestnut-capped blackbird, Chrysomus ruficapillus
- Saffron-cowled blackbird, Xanthopsar flavus
- Yellow-rumped marshbird, Pseudoleistes guirahuro
- Brown-and-yellow marshbird, Pseudoleistes virescens

== Wood-warblers ==
Order: Passeriformes Family: Parulidae

The wood-warblers are a group of small, often colorful, passerine birds restricted to the New World. Most are arboreal, but some are terrestrial. Most members of this family are insectivores. Five species have been recorded in Uruguay.

- Masked yellowthroat, Geothlypis aequinoctialis
- Tropical parula, Setophaga pitiayumi
- Blackpoll warbler, Setophaga striata (V)
- White-browed warbler, Myiothlypis leucoblephara
- Golden-crowned warbler, Basileuterus culicivorus

== Cardinal grosbeaks ==
Order: Passeriformes Family: Cardinalidae

The cardinals are a family of robust, seed-eating birds with strong bills. They are typically associated with open woodland. The sexes usually have distinct plumages. Three species have been recorded in Uruguay.

- Hepatic tanager, Piranga flava
- Glaucous-blue grosbeak, Cyanoloxia glaucocaerulea
- Ultramarine grosbeak, Cyanoloxia brissonii

== Tanagers ==
Order: Passeriformes Family: Thraupidae

The tanagers are a large group of small to medium-sized passerine birds restricted to the New World, mainly in the tropics. Many species are brightly colored. As a family they are omnivorous, but individual species specialize in eating fruits, seeds, insects, or other types of food. Most have short, rounded wings. Forty species have been recorded in Uruguay.

- Saffron finch, Sicalis flaveola
- Grassland yellow-finch, Sicalis luteola
- Mourning sierra-finch, Rhopospina fruticeti (V)
- Blue-black grassquit, Volatinia jacarina
- Ruby-crowned tanager, Tachyphonus coronatus (V)
- Black-goggled tanager, Trichothraupis melanops
- Red-crested finch, Coryphospingus cucullatus
- Swallow tanager, Tersina viridis (V)
- White-bellied seedeater, Sporophila leucoptera (V)
- Pearly-bellied seedeater, Sporophila pileata
- Tawny-bellied seedeater, Sporophila hypoxantha
- Dark-throated seedeater, Sporophila ruficollis
- Marsh seedeater, Sporophila palustris
- Rufous-rumped seedeater, Sporophila hypochroma
- Chestnut seedeater, Sporophila cinnamomea
- Double-collared seedeater, Sporophila caerulescens
- Rusty-collared seedeater, Sporophila collaris
- Many-colored chaco finch, Saltatricula multicolor
- Bluish-gray saltator, Saltator coerulescens
- Green-winged saltator, Saltator similis
- Golden-billed saltator, Saltator aurantiirostris
- Great Pampa-finch, Embernagra platensis
- Wedge-tailed grass-finch, Emberizoides herbicola
- Lesser grass-finch, Emberizoides ypiranganus
- Cinnamon warbling finch, Poospiza ornata (V)
- Black-and-rufous warbling finch, Poospiza nigrorufa
- Gray-throated warbling finch, Microspingus cabanisi
- Ringed warbling finch, Microspingus torquatus (V)
- Black-capped warbling finch, Microspingus melanoleucus
- Long-tailed reed finch, Donacospiza albifrons
- Bananaquit, Coereba flaveola
- Diuca finch, Diuca diuca (V)
- Yellow cardinal, Gubernatrix cristata
- Red-crested cardinal, Paroaria coronata
- Yellow-billed cardinal, Paroaria capitata
- Diademed tanager, Stephanophorus diadematus
- Fawn-breasted tanager, Pipraeidea melanonota
- Blue-and-yellow tanager, Rauenia bonariensis
- Chestnut-backed tanager, Stilpnia preciosa
- Sayaca tanager, Thraupis sayaca

== See also ==
- Fauna of Uruguay
- List of birds
- Lists of birds by region
