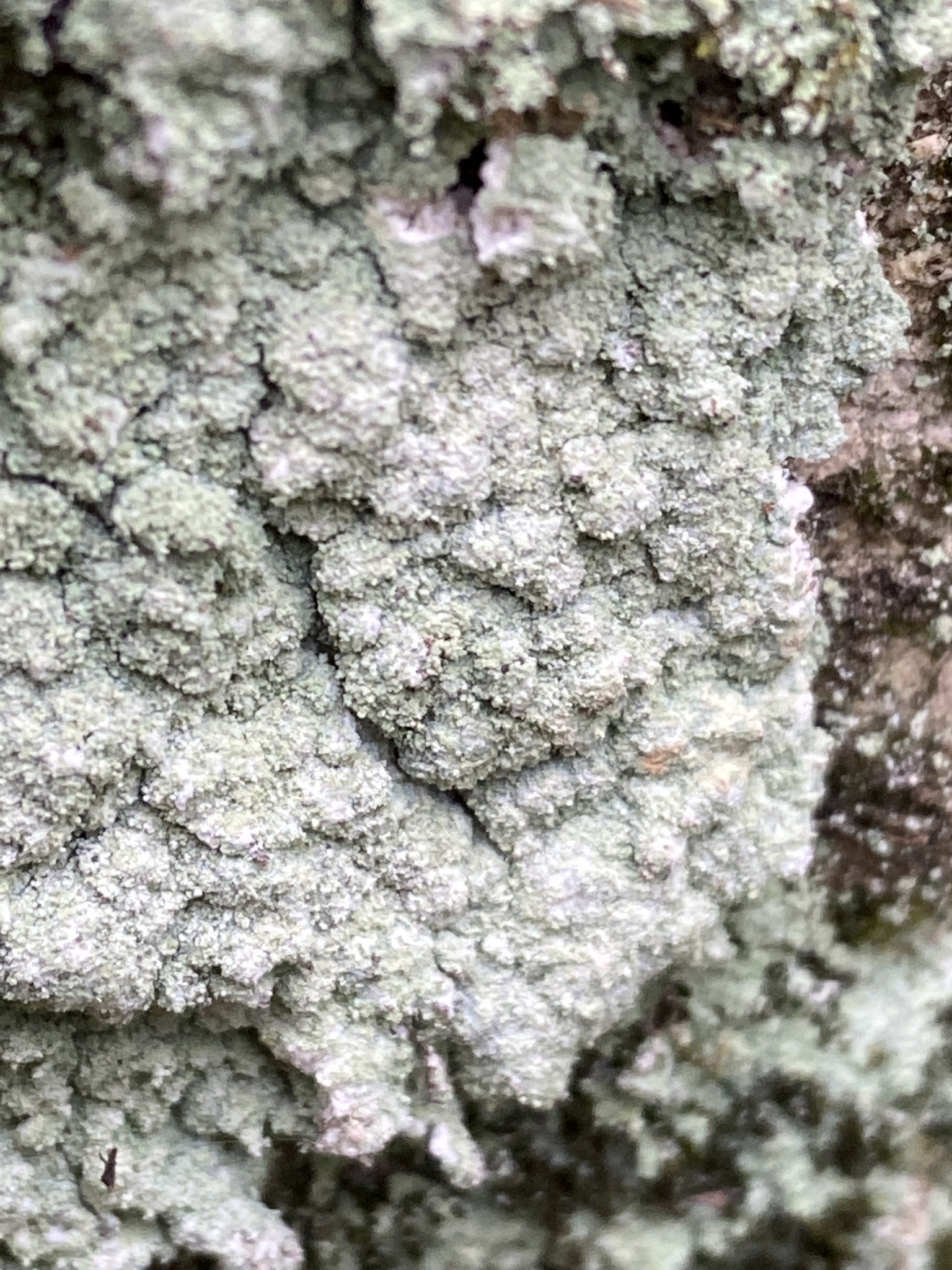

Scientific classification
- Kingdom: Fungi
- Division: Ascomycota
- Class: Lecanoromycetes
- Order: Lecanorales
- Family: Stereocaulaceae
- Genus: Lepraria
- Species: L. lobificans

Binomial name
- Lepraria lobificans Nyl. (1873)

Synonyms
- List: Leproloma lobificans (Nyl.) Boistel (1903); Crocynia andrewii B.de Lesd. (1924); Crocynia mollissima B.de Lesd. (1924); Crocynia subaeruginosa Räsänen (1944)

= Lepraria lobificans =

Species of lichen

Lepraria lobificans is a species of leprose lichen in the family Stereocaulaceae. The species was first described in 1873 by the Finnish lichenologist William Nylander from specimens collected in France. It typically grows on bark, rock, and mossy substrates in shaded, humid forest environments. It is characterised by its cottony texture, weakly developed lobes, and chemical composition including atranorin and stictic acid. Molecular studies have since shown that Lepraria lobificans sensu stricto is genetically distinct from the closely related and more widespread L. finkii, with which it was previously confused. The species has been reported from Europe, Asia, and the Americas, though many historical records from the Southern Hemisphere likely represent L. finkii.

== Taxonomy ==
Lepraria lobificans was described by the Finnish lichenologist William Nylander in 1873 in his lichenological observations of the eastern Pyrenees, based on a type specimen collected in France. In his original description, Nylander noted that the species occurs on earth in rock fissures or at the base of rock crevices, often in association with Endocarpiscum (a rare genus, now synonymous with Heppia), and characterised it by its yellow-green thallus and lobate margins with a distinctive yellow reaction when treated with potassium hydroxide solution (the K spot test), whilst lacking visible apothecia.

Subsequent molecular studies have clarified the complex nomenclatural history surrounding Lepraria lobificans and L. finkii. Nylander's original concept of L. lobificans was later broadened by some authors, including Laundon (1992), who treated L. finkii as a synonym. However, phylogenetic analyses using nuclear ITS and mitochondrial SSU sequence data have shown that specimens identified as L. lobificans by various authors actually belong to distinct lineages. In 2021, Barcenas-Peña and colleagues demonstrated that L. finkii forms a distinct evolutionary lineage (clade) separate from L. lobificans in the strict sense, and that earlier genetic sequences in GenBank labelled as L. lobificans by authors other than Nylander should be reassigned to L. finkii. Their revision followed the interpretation of Lendemer (2013), who restricted L. lobificans to the morphotype previously known as L. santosii, characterised by atranorin, stictic, and constictic acids. In their combined ITS + mtSSU analysis, L. lobificans formed a distinct, well-supported lineage within Lepraria, separate from the widespread L. finkii and the Australasian L. ulrikii, which are morphologically similar species but genetically independent.

Pre-molecular treatments consistently diagnosed L. lobificans as a woolly, stratified leprose species with abundant consoredia, incomplete soredial walls and conspicuous projecting hyphae, and with a chemical profile of atranorin + stictic/constictic acids plus zeorin (and occasional minor lipophilic traces). Those criteria underpinned many "cosmopolitan" records through the 1990s–2000s and the comparisons with L. elobata, L. multiacida, and others. Subsequent sequence-based work has constrained that broad usage in some regions.

== Description ==
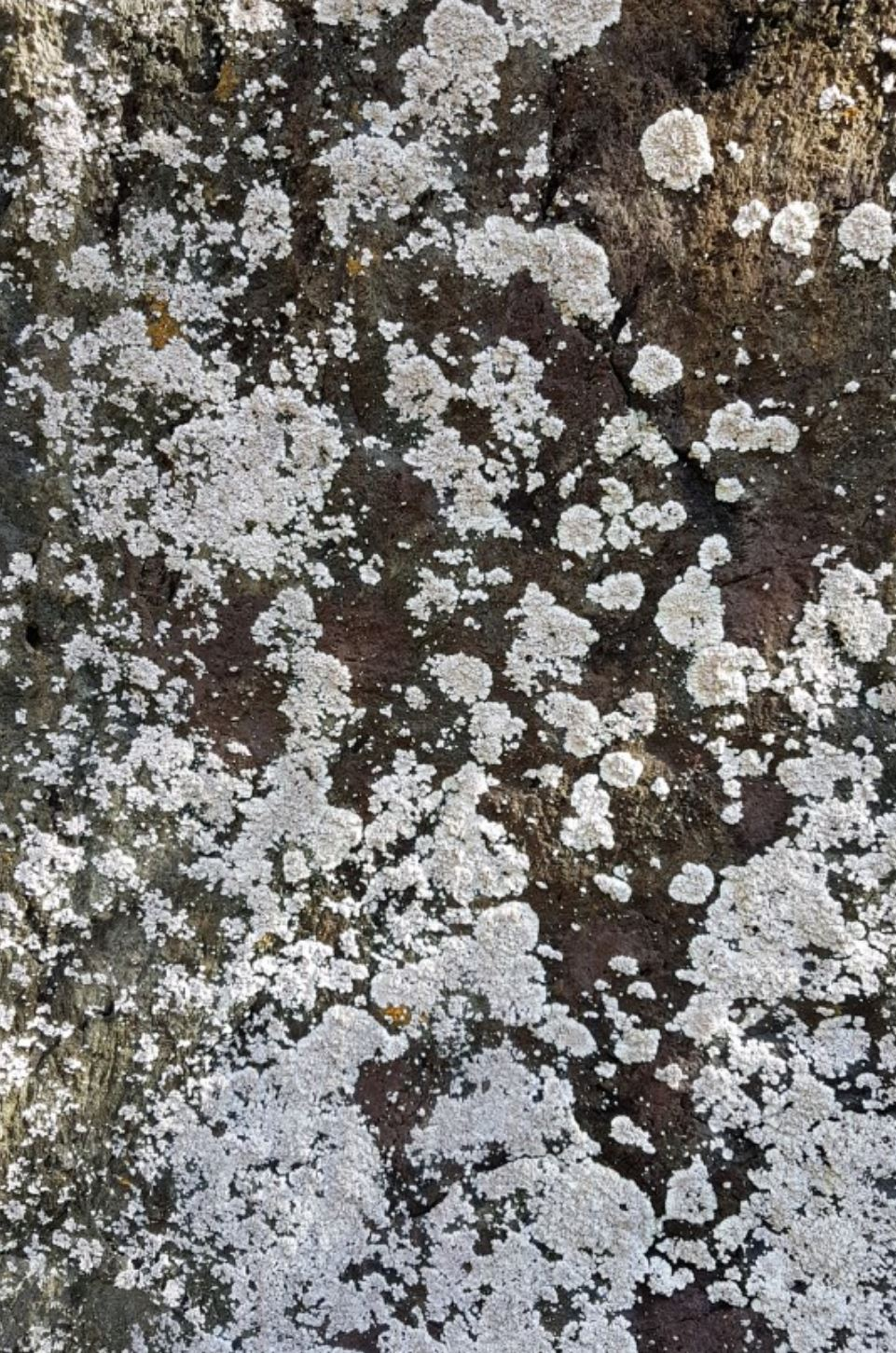
Lepraria lobificans in Norway

The thallus of Lepraria lobificans is cottony, only rarely powdery, with a usually diffuse margin and weakly developed lobes when present. A thick, white medulla is characteristic; the hypothallus is seldom developed and then pale brown. Unsorediate patches may expose the medulla. The propagules are abundant, fine soredia to about 60 μm across with long, projecting hyphae; they commonly form clustered consoredia about 100–200 μm in diameter. Chemically, the species contains atranorin together with the stictic acid complex and zeorin. Lepraria elobata has the same major substances but differs in having a non-lobate, leprose thallus and discrete soredia lacking projecting hyphae.

Spot test reactions are typically C−, KC−, P+ (orange), and K negative to weakly yellow; the chemistry is dominated by atranorin with stictic/constictic acids, often with zeorin, and may include traces of additional fat-soluble (lipophilic) compounds. This combination matches the "L. lobificans s.str." chemotypes reported from southern Europe, which can include occasional roccellic acid, and it contrasts with L. finkii, where sequence-based work and chemistry (including zeorin with minor norstictic acid) support separation. Differentially, look-alikes with a similar depsidone profile can be told apart as follows: L. elobata (discrete soredia, no projecting hyphae); L. leprolomopsis (zeorin replaced by an unidentified terpenoid); and L. multiacida (additional salazinic/consalazinic acids). The name L. santosii used by some older authors refers to a lobate-margined taxon with a slightly raised rim.

== Habitat and distribution ==
Lepraria lobificans grows on bark, rock (often where mosses are present), and other substrates, typically in shaded or otherwise sheltered microsites; it has been reported from many regions worldwide. Pre-molecular treatments recorded it as cosmopolitan and very common in parts of its range, with reports from all continents except Antarctica and first national records that include Jamaica and Vietnam. In South America it has been reported from Bolivia and Uruguay, occurring in high-elevation Andean vegetation, mountain cloud forest and lowlands. More recent sequence-based work indicates that material once referred to L. lobificans in the Southern Hemisphere (e.g. Chile) belongs to L. finkii, and that L. lobificans sensu stricto may have a more restricted distribution than previously assumed. In India the species occurs widely from the Himalayan foothills to southern hill ranges at elevations of roughly 500–3,000 m, on bark, rock, soil and mossy substrates, often alongside other leprose lichens.

In Central Europe, studies in the Knyszyn Forest (NE Poland) found L. lobificans to be among the most frequent Lepraria species, chiefly on bark of deciduous trees such as Carpinus betulus, Quercus robur, Fraxinus excelsior, Populus tremula and Tilia cordata, with occasional records on Picea abies. The species is hygrophilous (adapted for growth in a damp or wet environment), typically in shaded to semi-shaded forest habitats on meso- to eutrophic, moderately acidic to basic substrates. It also colonises rocks and mossy surfaces and is sometimes found in more open sites near lakes and rivers, but is rarely recorded from roadside trees. Within that forest it was present across several community types and was most frequent in oak–hornbeam (Tilio-Carpinetum) stands, with additional records from maple–linden slope forest, alder carr, riparian alder forest, pine forest (Peucedano-Pinetum) and bog–spruce forest (Sphagno girgensohnii-Piceetum).
