= Queguay Grande River =

Coordinates: 32°08′21″S 58°08′30″W

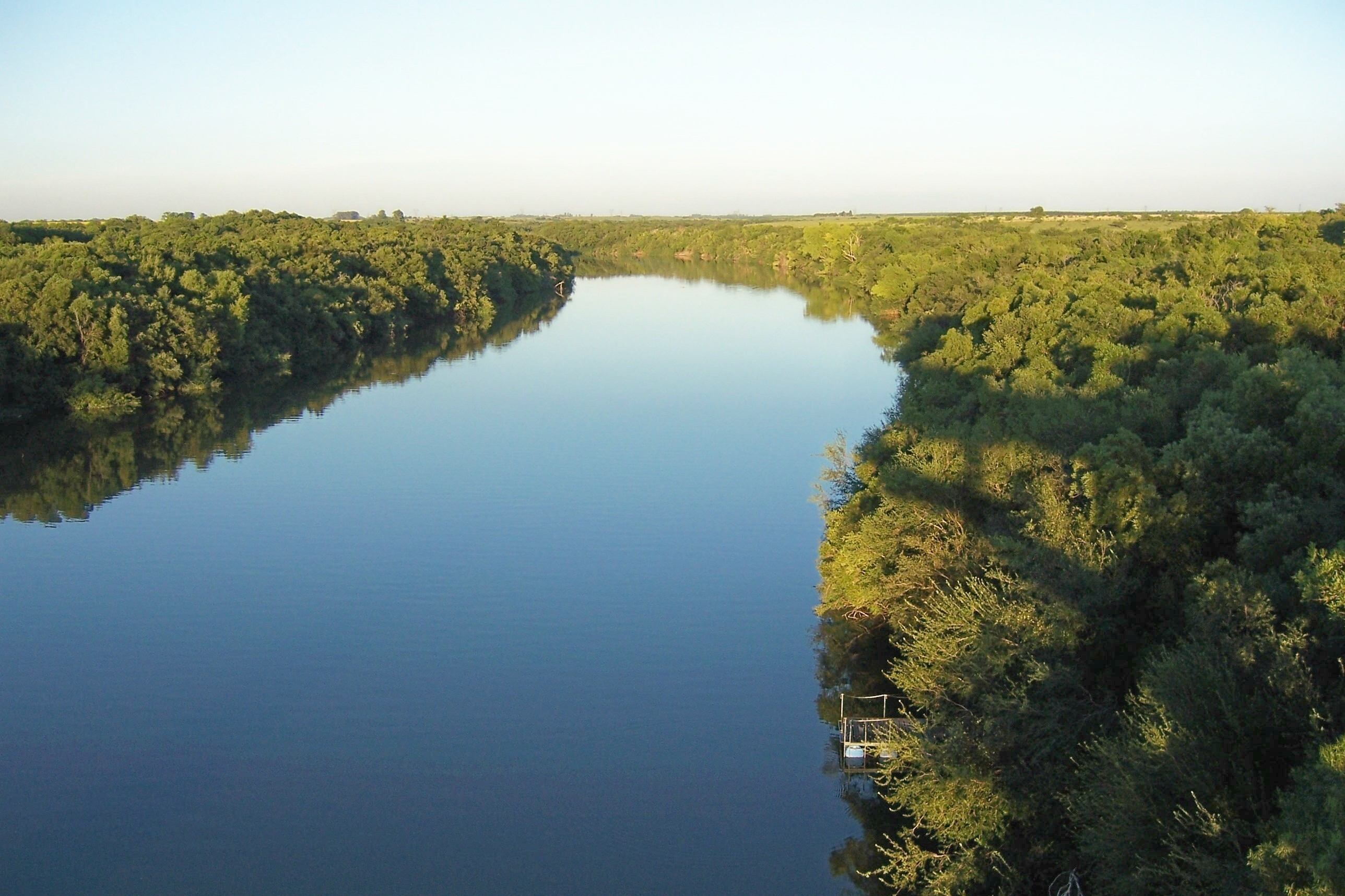
- River seen from a bridge in Paysandú

Location
- Country: Uruguay

The Queguay Grande River is a river of Uruguay.

== See also ==
- List of rivers of Uruguay
