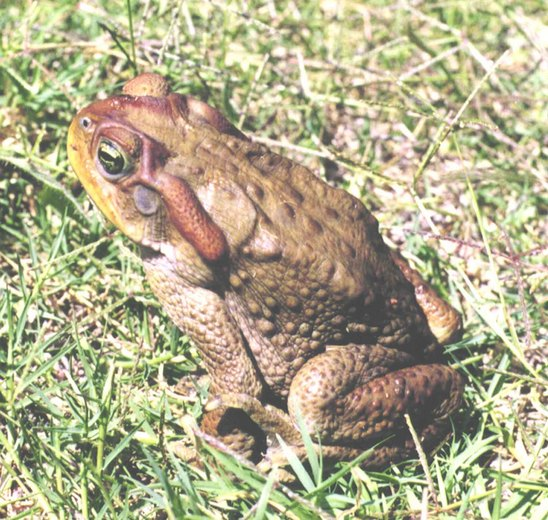

Conservation status
- Least Concern (IUCN 3.1)

Scientific classification
- Kingdom: Animalia
- Phylum: Chordata
- Class: Amphibia
- Order: Anura
- Family: Bufonidae
- Genus: Rhinella
- Species: R. achavali

Binomial name
- Rhinella achavali (Maneyro, Arrieta, and de Sá, 2004)

Synonyms
- Bufo achavali Maneyro, Arrieta, and de Sá, 2004; Chaunus achavali (Maneyro, Arrieta, and de Sá, 2004)

= Rhinella achavali =

Species of amphibian

Rhinella achavali is a species of toads in the family Bufonidae that is found in Uruguay and southernmost Brazil (Rio Grande do Sul).

Rhinella achavali are found in or near small forest streams. It is locally common but its habitat is threatened by plantations of exotic wood species.
