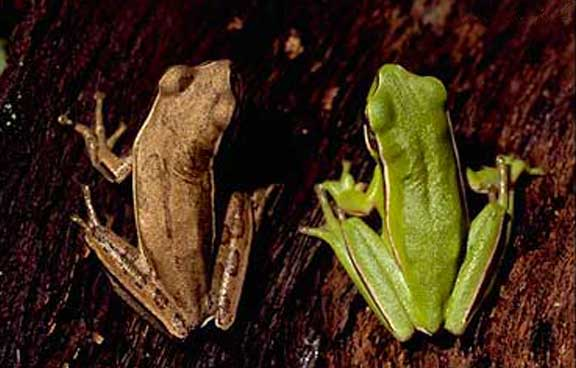

Conservation status
- Least Concern (IUCN 3.1)

Scientific classification
- Kingdom: Animalia
- Phylum: Chordata
- Class: Amphibia
- Order: Anura
- Family: Hylidae
- Genus: Boana
- Species: B. pulchella

Binomial name
- Boana pulchella (Duméril & Bibron, 1841)

Synonyms
- Hyla agrestis Bibron in Bell, 1843; Hyla albovittata Lichtenstein & Martens, 1856; Hyla leucomelas Duméril & Bibron, 1841; Hyla leucotaenia Burmeister, 1861; Hyla mocquardi Günther, 1901; Hyla pulchella Duméril and Bibron, 1841; Hypsiboas pulchellus (Duméril and Bibron, 1841)

= Montevideo tree frog =

Species of amphibian

The Montevideo tree frog (Boana pulchella) is a species of frog in the family Hylidae found in eastern, central, and northern Argentina, south-eastern Brazil, south-eastern Paraguay, and Uruguay. It is a common species occurring in open habitats in forests, grasslands, and flooded savannas. Breeding takes place in permanent ponds and flooded grasslands.

The diet of Argentinean Boana pulchella was found to consist mostly of spiders, dipterans and, crickets. During the cold time of the year, these frogs continue to feed at high rate, instead of partly relying on their fat reserves as the sympatric Dendropsophus nanus do.
