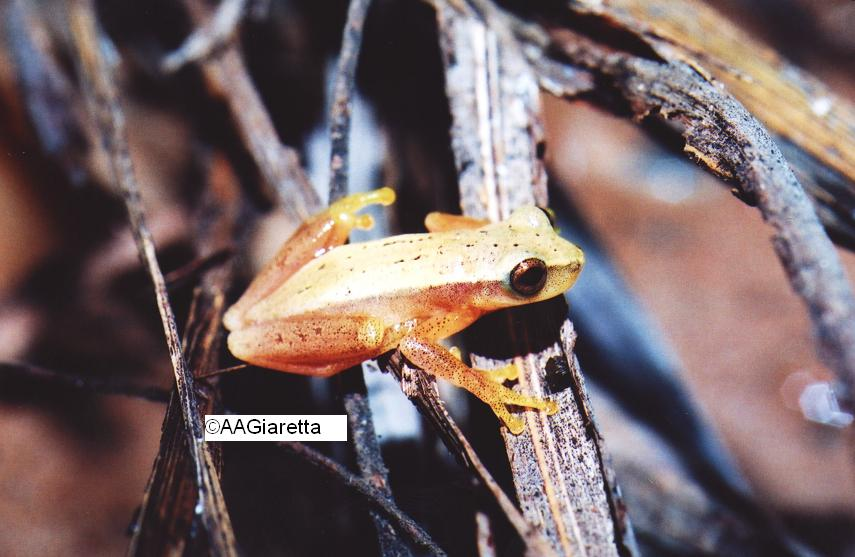

Conservation status
- Least Concern (IUCN 3.1)

Scientific classification
- Kingdom: Animalia
- Phylum: Chordata
- Class: Amphibia
- Order: Anura
- Family: Hylidae
- Genus: Dendropsophus
- Species: D. nanus

Binomial name
- Dendropsophus nanus (Boulenger, 1889)

Synonyms
- Hyla nana Boulenger, 1889

= Dendropsophus nanus =

Species of frog

Dendropsophus nanus, commonly known as dwarf treefrog, is a species of frog in the family Hylidae.

It is found in northern Argentina, Paraguay, Uruguay, eastern Bolivia, Brazil, French Guiana, and Suriname. It is very common frog occurring in many habitat types and adapting well to anthropogenic disturbance. It inhabits herbaceous vegetation at the edge of standing water. Breeding takes place in temporary waterbodies.

The diet of Argentinean Dendropsophus nanus was found to consist mostly of dipterans and spiders. During the cold periods, these frogs partly rely on their fat reserves, more so than sympatric Hypsiboas pulchellus.
