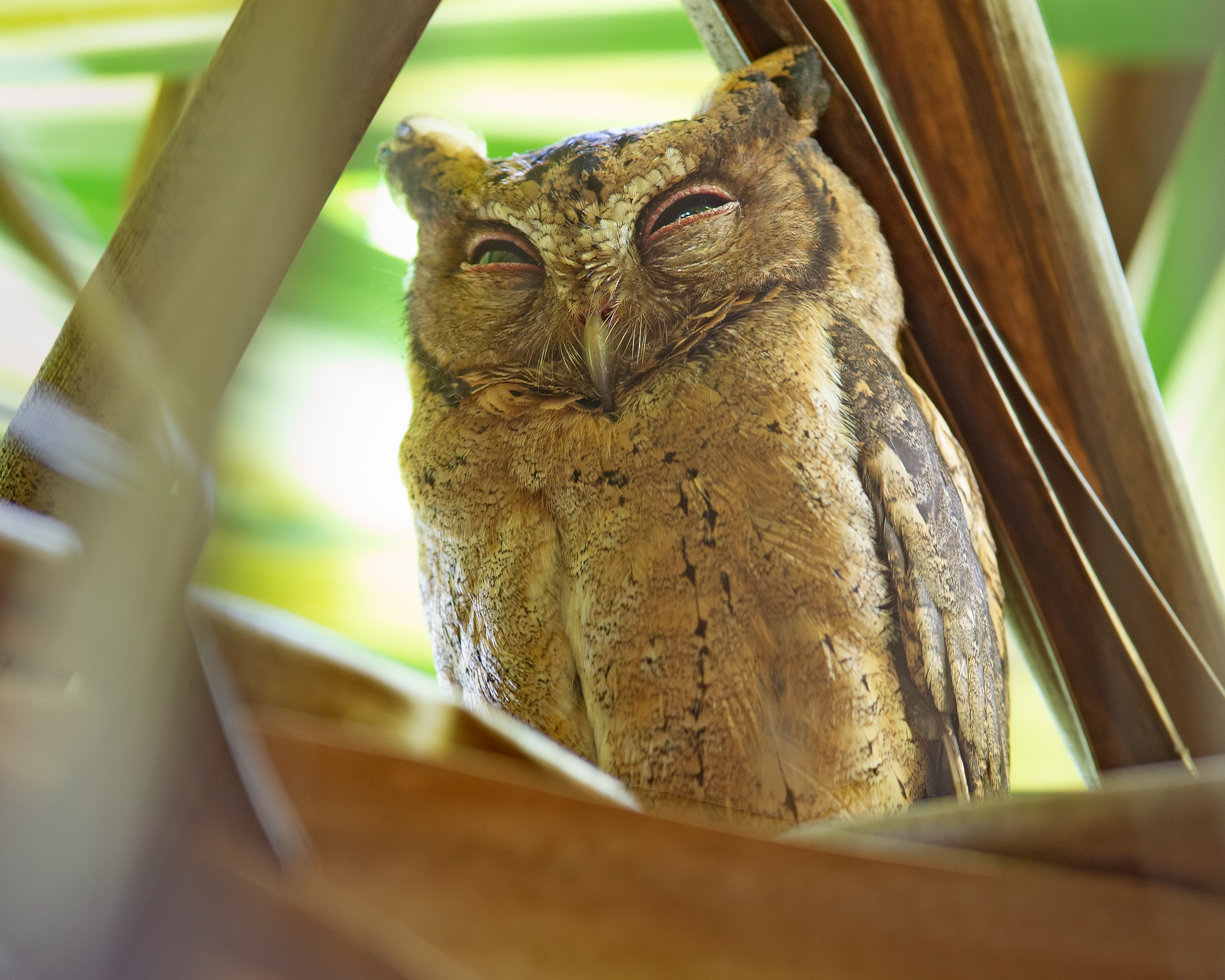
- In Singapore.

Conservation status
- Least Concern (IUCN 3.1)
- CITES Appendix II

Scientific classification
- Kingdom: Animalia
- Phylum: Chordata
- Class: Aves
- Order: Strigiformes
- Family: Strigidae
- Genus: Otus
- Species: O. lempiji

Binomial name
- Otus lempiji (Horsfield, 1821)

= Sunda scops owl =

Species of owl

The Sunda scops owl (Otus lempiji) is a small brown owl native to the Sunda Islands.

== Taxonomy ==
The taxon is considered a subspecies of O. bakkamoena by some authors.

== Description ==
It grows from 20 to 25 cm (7.9 to 9.8 in) and can weigh 100 to 170 g (3.5 to 6.0 oz). It is speckled with black on the upper parts and streaked with black on the lower parts. It has a light collar and dark eyes, which differentiate it from the reddish scops, mountain scops, Oriental scops and Rajah scops owls.

== Distribution and habitat ==
It lives on the Malay Peninsula, Singapore, Borneo, Sumatra and Java. It can be found primarily in forests and gardens but is occasionally attracted to buildings.

== Diet ==
The diet of the Sunda scops owl mainly consists of insects, as well as small animals. Some examples of the prey they hunt are rats, small fish, lizards, crickets, and beetles’ larvae. However, their most preferred prey are rats.

== Conservation ==
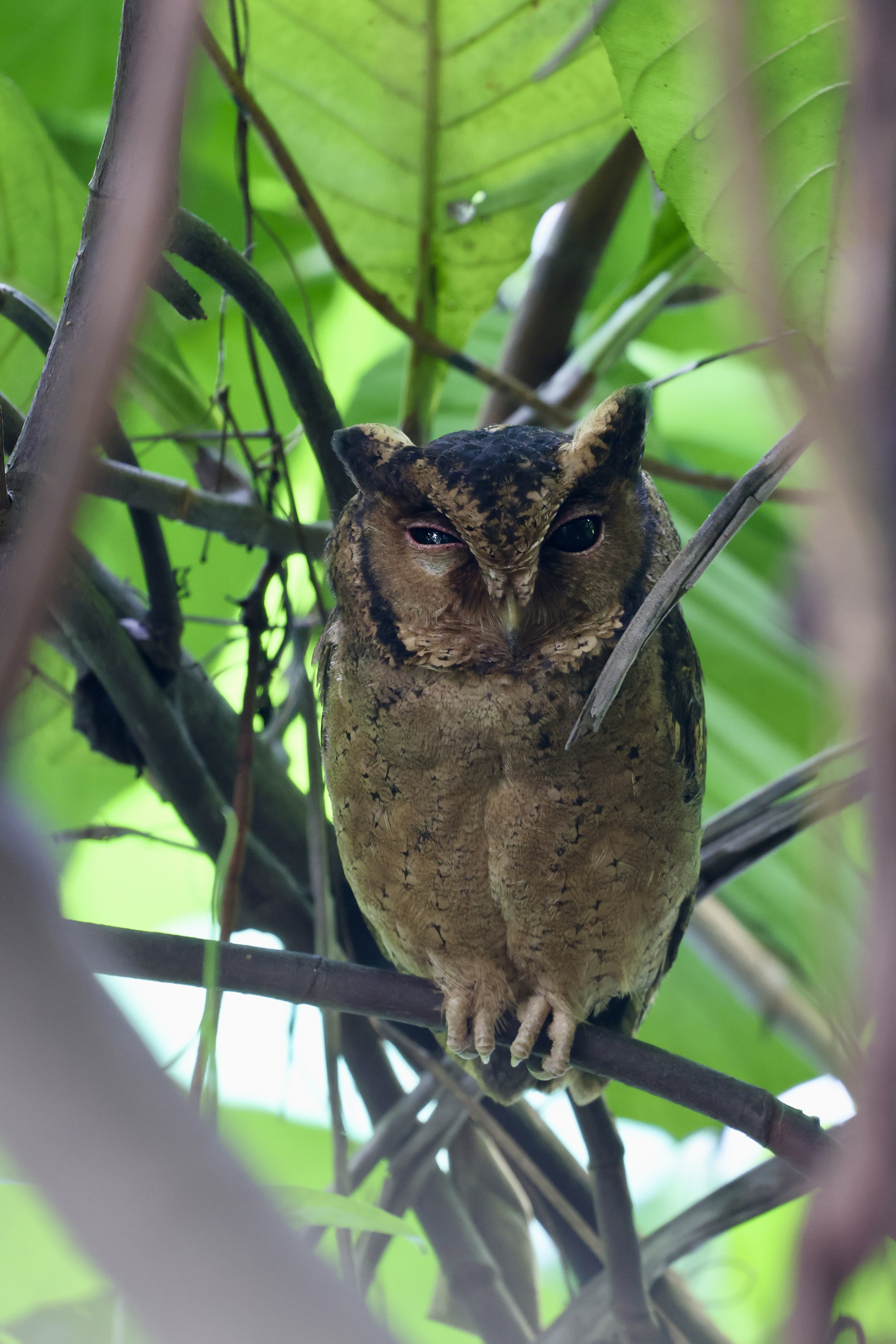

It has been included in the IUCN Red List of threatened species as a least concern species. It is common throughout its range where there is suitable habitat.

== Behaviour ==
=== Breeding ===
The Sunda scops owl lines its nest with plant fibre. It will lay up to three eggs in a tree hollow from January to April and their breeding season can sometimes be extended to June or late July. The Sunda scops owl tends to behave aggressively when threatened by other owls by displaying territorial behavior. A female Sunda scops owl will react aggressively when feeling threatened by responding vocally to warn intruders from interfering and keeping them at a distance.

=== Voice ===
Its call is a hooting yelp in between a longer period of silence. Sunda scops owls use their callings to mark their territory and have evolved to have voice individuality to improve their territory proclamation. Every owl has its own unique vocal characteristics such as varying frequencies at which they produce their callings/noises which gives them each a unique voice. Having a unique voice/calling makes it easier for an owl to stand out from its competitors and mark its territory more effectively.

== Gallery ==
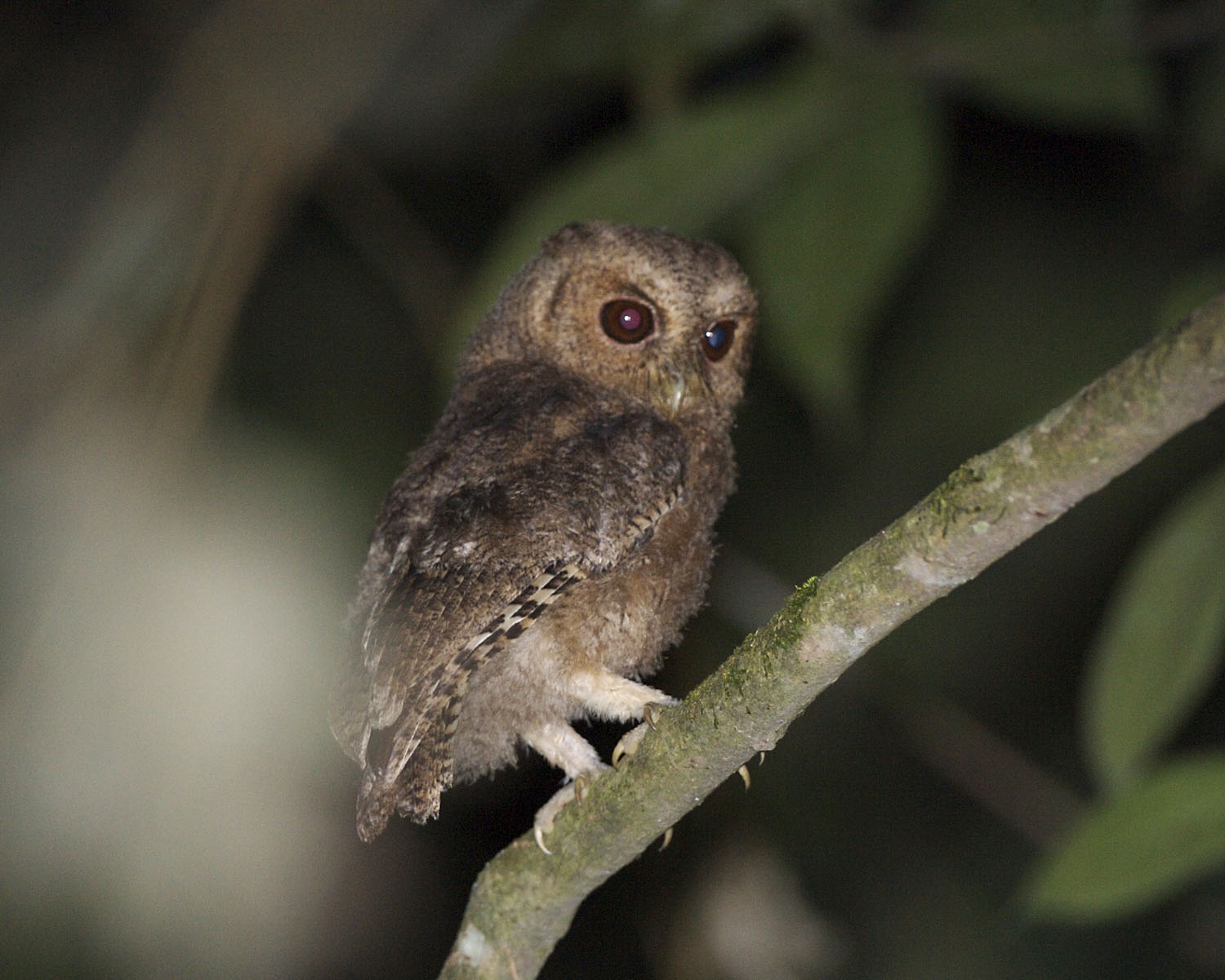
From Gunung Gede, West Java

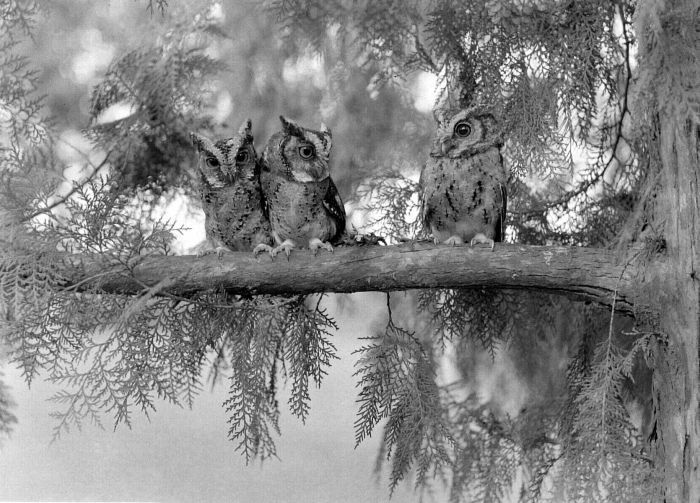
Historic (c. 1938) image of an adult with two young, Dampar, East Java.
