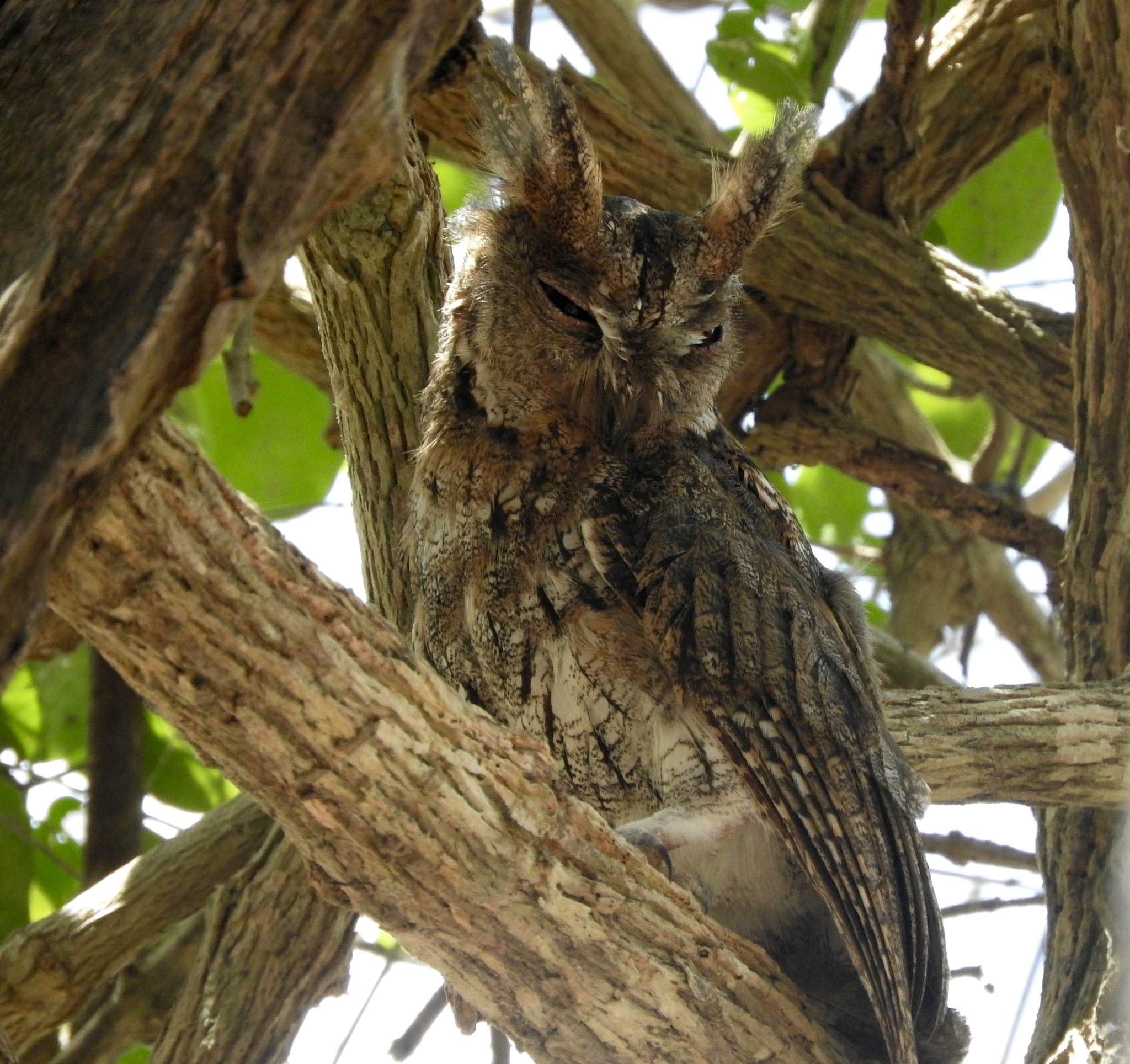

Conservation status
- Least Concern (IUCN 3.1)
- CITES Appendix II

Scientific classification
- Kingdom: Animalia
- Phylum: Chordata
- Class: Aves
- Order: Strigiformes
- Family: Strigidae
- Genus: Otus
- Species: O. silvicola

Binomial name
- Otus silvicola (Wallace, 1864)
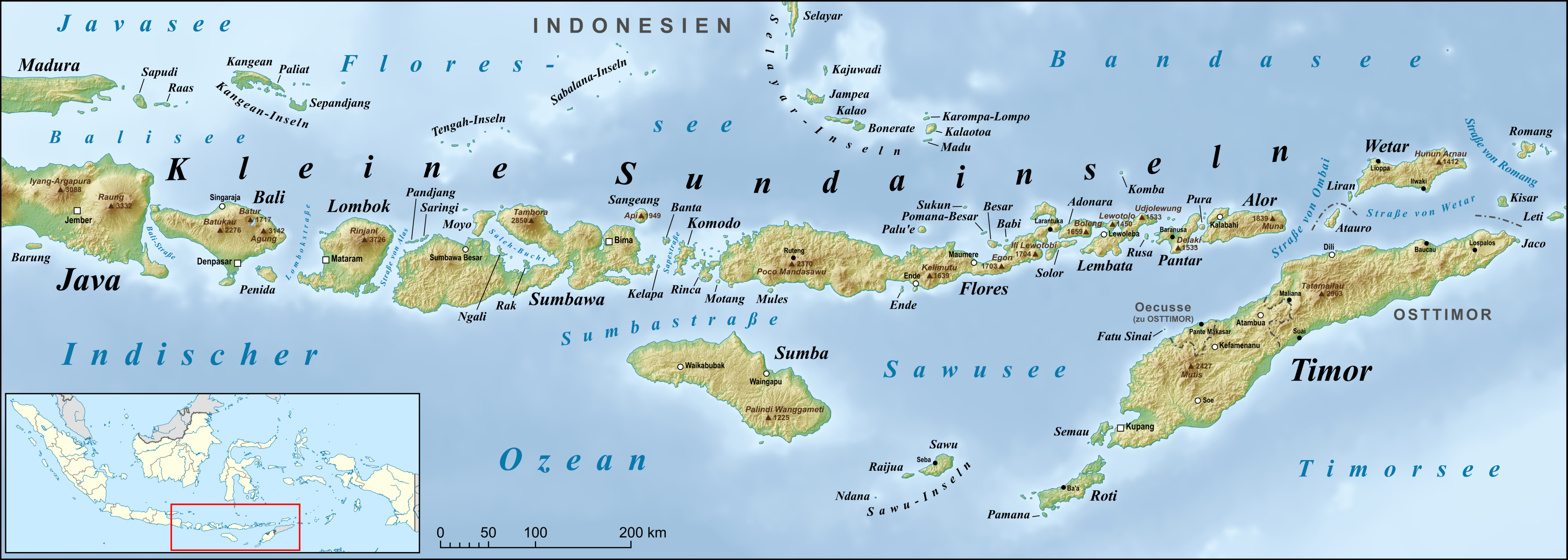

= Wallace's scops owl =

Species of bird endemic to Indonesia

Wallace's scops owl or lesser Sunda scops owl (Otus silvicola) is endemic to the Sumbawa and Flores islands, in the Lesser Sundas chain of Indonesia. It is not rare in most of its habitat and has no subspecies except for the nominate. It is also known as the Lesser Sunda scops owl. It is named after Alfred Russel Wallace, a British naturalist, explorer, geographer, and biologist.

This strictly nocturnal owl has a mostly brown plumage, long ear tufts, bright yellow eyes, and strong underparts streaking. The adult can average 23 to 27 cm (9 to 10^{1/2} inches) in length and weigh about 210g (7^{1/2} ounces). It can be recognized through its vocalization, which resembles the swishing sound of a sword.

According to the International Union for Conservation of Nature and Natural Resources (IUCN), this species has been listed as "Least Concern" since its latest assessment in 2016. That assessment has shown that the species' population trend is stable.

Little is known about this bird and more research is needed to better understand its behaviour, reproduction, and diet patterns.

== Description ==
The adult Wallace's scops owl has a body length of 23 to 27 cm (9 to 10^{1/2} in), a wingspan between 202 and 251 cm (79^{1/2} and 99 in), and can weigh around 210 g (7^{1/2} oz).

This small bird has a characteristic owl-shaped face with long ear tufts and bright yellow eyes. It has brown plumage, a light-coloured face, grayish bill and cere, black 'herringbone' on brown to reddish vermiculations, pale breast and flanks lined with defined dark shaft streaks, and dark wavy cross-bars. Its breast is slightly darker than the sides of the bird's belly which center is white. The upper parts of the plumage are a paler gray-brown colour.

Its flight feathers are a buff colour crossed by dark brown bars while its tail is brown with buff-colored bars. The owls' tarsi and some of its toes phalanges are feathered. Compared with the adult, the juvenile bird is generally paler and its plumage is more fluffy.

== Taxonomy ==
In the middle of the 1800s, the owls were separated into two distinct taxonomic groups: the Strigidae and the Tytonidae. The Wallace's Scops owl is part of the Strigidae family, which is also called the "true owl" or "typical owl" family. These birds are known for their iconic owl looks with their large eyes, facial discs, nocturnal lifestyle, and soundless flight.

There is a sympatric relationship between the Wallace's scops owl and the Flores scops owl (O. alfredi), which is also present in the Lesser Sundas but is much smaller than the Wallace's scops owl.

== Habitat and distribution ==
Only found on the Flores and Sumbawa islands of Indonesia, this bird has a large range of habitats. It has been found in forested areas, agricultural lands (plantations and secondary growth), houses' backyards, and bamboo thickets. It has been reported to perch itself at the very top of tall trees or in concealed positions, making it difficult to observe it.

Wallace's scops owls have been reported to be common at ranges of 350–1,600 meters (1,150 to 5,200 ft).

== Behaviour ==
The Wallace's scops Owl is known to be nocturnal. It is also presumed to be sedentary on Flores and Sumbawa in the Lesser Sundas in Indonesia.

=== Vocalizations ===
Three main calls have been reported for this bird:

- The first one consists of a series of "hwomph" notes that can be repeated 9 to 18 times. This call is believed to be the bird's territorial vocalization pattern. It is a toneless call that sounds like a swishing sword.
- The second call consists of a series of gruff "rrow" notes repeated at intervals of about a second and at about the same pitch as the previous call.
- The third one is a whistle call with varying overtones.

=== Diet ===
This owl species is thought to be mainly insectivorous, but further studies are necessary to determine its diet with more precision.

=== Reproduction ===
Little to no information is known about this species' reproductive behaviour. It has been reported that the male presents enlarged testis in December.
