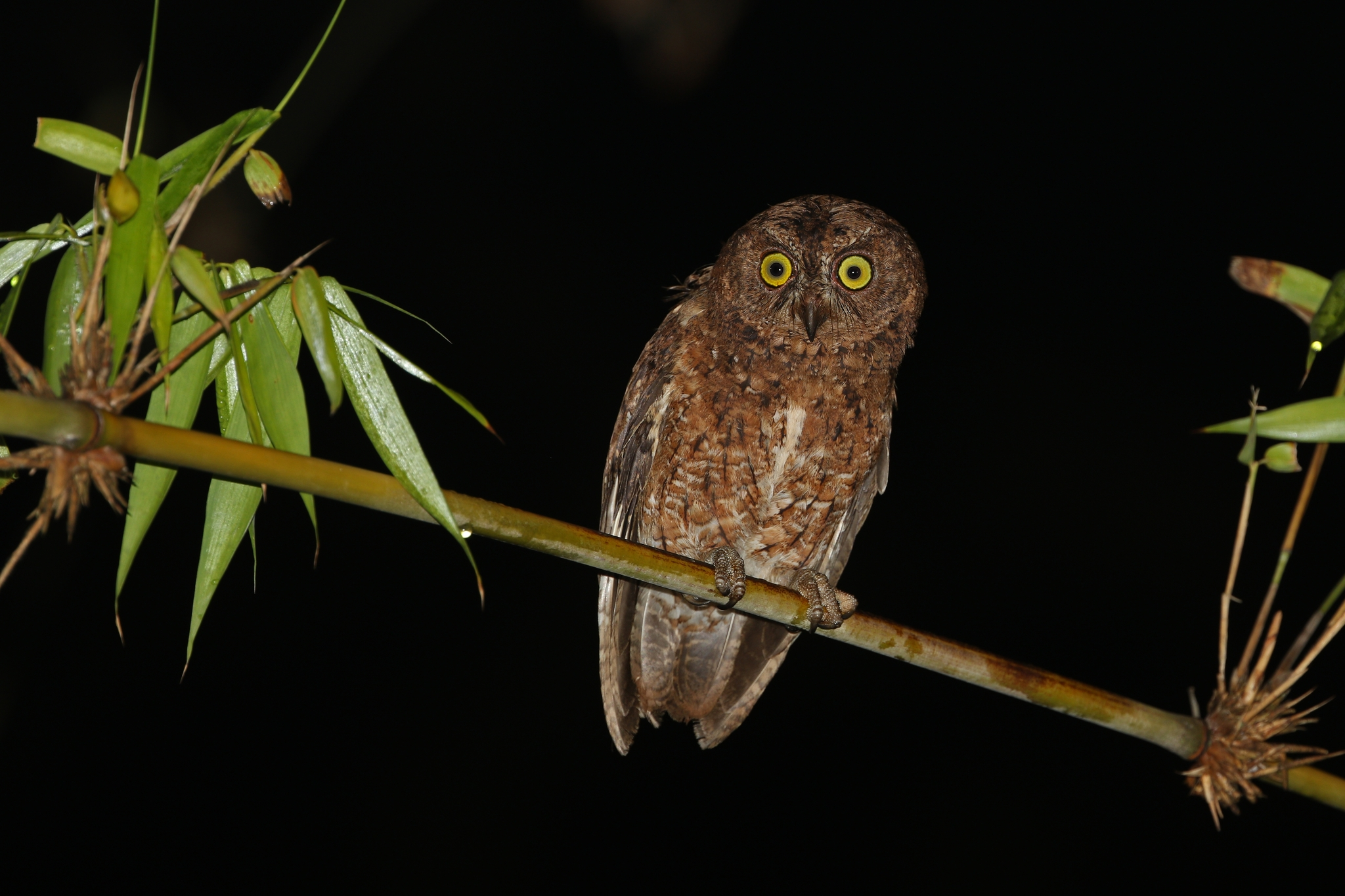

Conservation status
- Near Threatened (IUCN 3.1)

Scientific classification
- Kingdom: Animalia
- Phylum: Chordata
- Class: Aves
- Order: Strigiformes
- Family: Strigidae
- Genus: Otus
- Species: O. sulaensis

Binomial name
- Otus sulaensis (Hartert, 1898)

Synonyms
- Otus sulaensis Otus magicus sulaensis

= Sula scops owl =

Species of owl

The Sula scops owl (Otus sulaensis), is a small owl in the scops-owl genus Otus found on the Sula Islands of Indonesia. Taxonomically, some groups consider it to be a distinct species (Otus sulensis), others a subspecies of the Sulawesi scops owl, and yet others a subspecies of the Moluccan scops owl.
