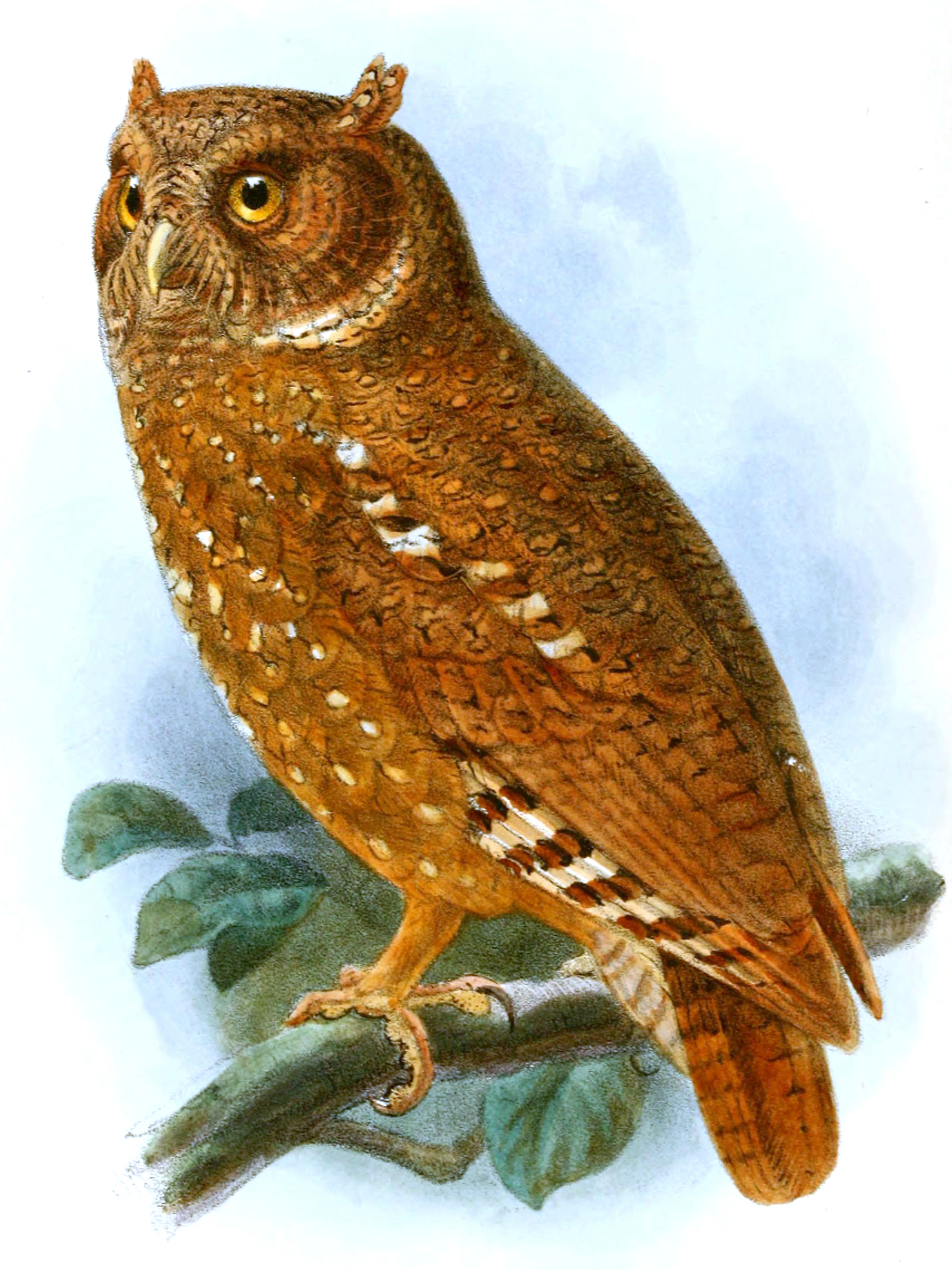
- An illustration of the holerythrus subspecies.
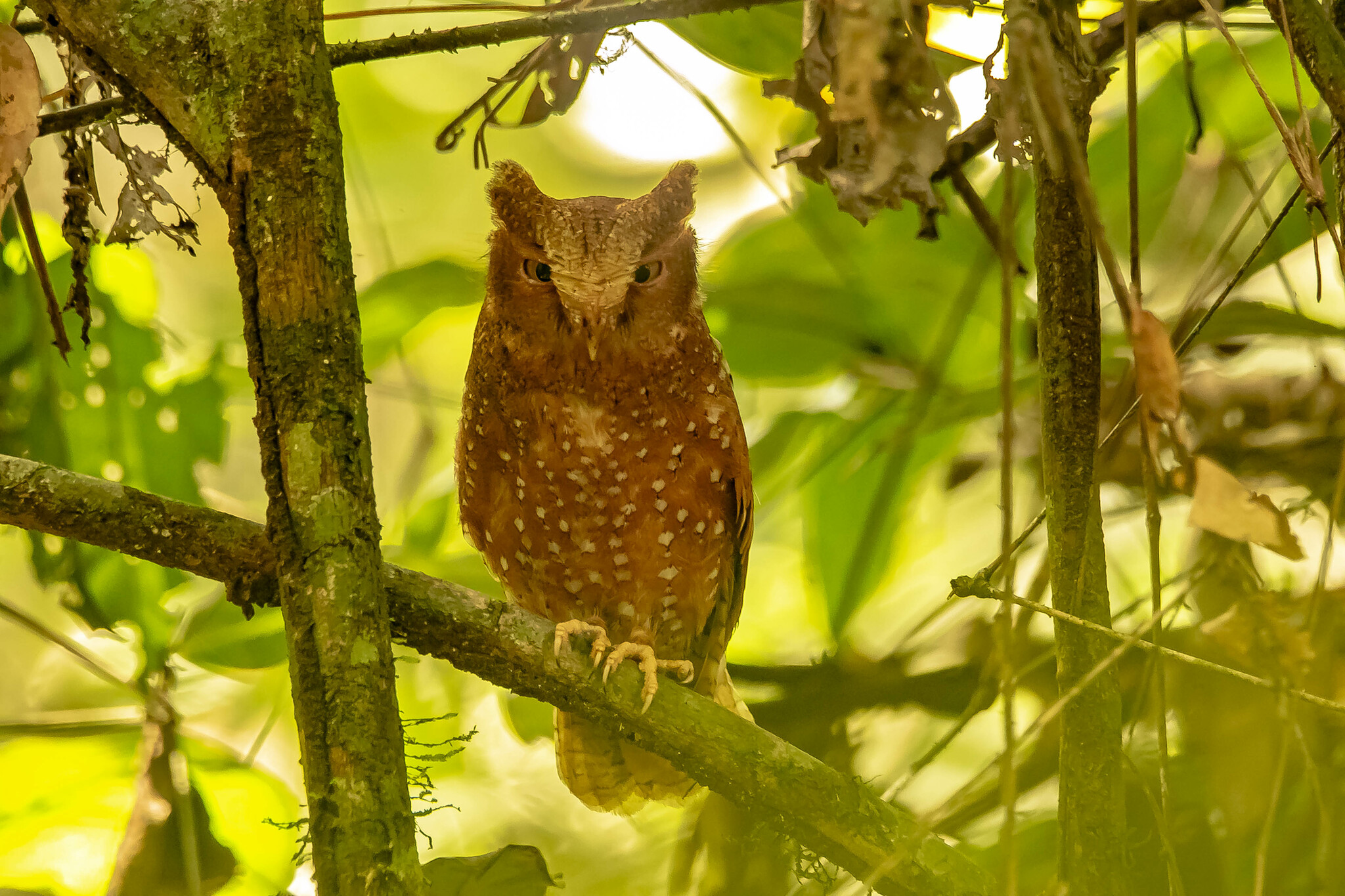

Conservation status
- Least Concern (IUCN 3.1)
- CITES Appendix II

Scientific classification
- Kingdom: Animalia
- Phylum: Chordata
- Class: Aves
- Order: Strigiformes
- Family: Strigidae
- Genus: Otus
- Species: O. icterorhynchus

Binomial name
- Otus icterorhynchus (Shelley, 1873)

= Sandy scops owl =

Species of owl

The sandy scops owl (Otus icterorhynchus), or cinnamon scops owl, is an owl from the family Strigidae found in Africa.

== Taxonomy ==
The sandy scops owl is thought to be basal in the lineage of the genus Otus, along with the Sokoke scops owl (Otus ireneae), but there has been no genetic material for testing from the sandy scops owl. In addition, some authorities consider that the subspecies of sandy scops owl should be treated as two different species.

== Subspecies ==
Two subspecies are currently recognised:

- Otus icterorhynchus icterorhynchus: West Africa
- Otus icterorhynchus holerythrus: northwestern central Africa.

== Description ==
A small owl which has an overall pale rufous colour, a plain face, a pale yellow bill and yellow eyes. The pale stripe along the shoulders is quite obvious. The adults are pale rufous brown, finely spotted with white and barred with buff. The underparts are paler and more rufous with buff bars and white spots on the belly and vent. The tail, flight feathers and greater upperwing coverts are rufous barred with black. Length is about 15 cm (5.9 in), and wingspan is 45 cm (18 in).

=== Voice ===
The sound is a long whistling "twooo" which descends in pitch.

== Distribution and habitat ==
The sandy scops owl has a scattered distribution across the African tropical rainforest; it has been recorded from Guinea, Liberia, Ivory Coast, Ghana, Cameroon, Gabon, Congo, Democratic Republic of Congo and Central African Republic.

The sandy scops owl occurs in lowland evergreen forest, open canopy forest and scrub, or in open forest mosaic land.

== Behaviour ==
The sandy scops owl is rarely seen and little is known about its habits. It is probably crepuscular and insectivorous feeding largely on grasshoppers and crickets. The breeding season is probably during February and March.
