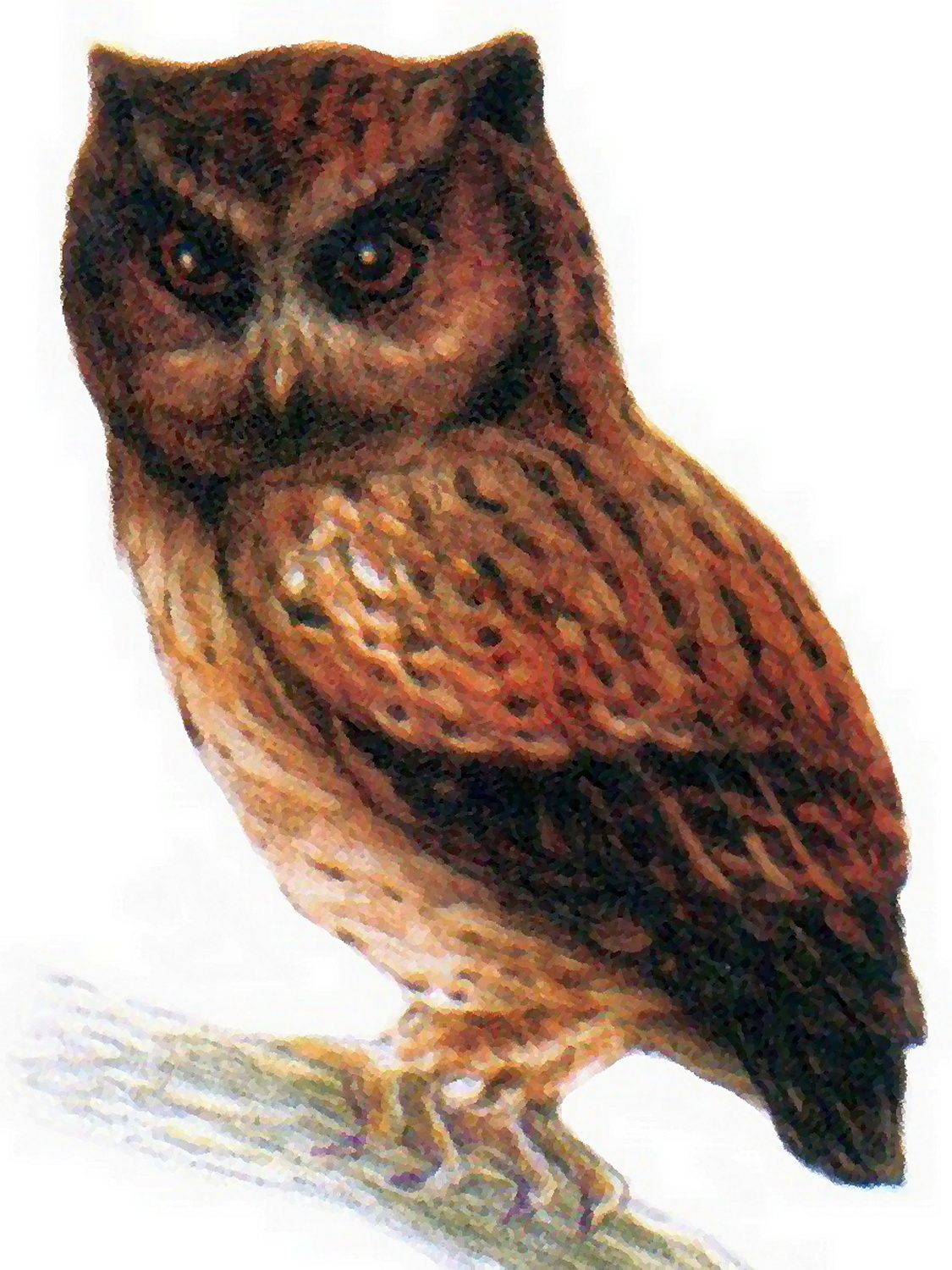

Conservation status
- Critically Endangered (IUCN 3.1)
- CITES Appendix II

Scientific classification
- Kingdom: Animalia
- Phylum: Chordata
- Class: Aves
- Order: Strigiformes
- Family: Strigidae
- Genus: Otus
- Species: O. siaoensis

Binomial name
- Otus siaoensis (Schlegel, 1873)

Synonyms
- Otus manadensis siaoensis; Otus magicus siaoensis

= Siau scops owl =

Species of owl

The Siau scops owl (Otus siaoensis) was believed to be a critically endangered owl species, purported to live on Siau Island, north of Sulawesi, Indonesia. The species is only known from a single holotype from 1866 although there have been more recent potential sightings, including one in 2017. The taxonomic arrangement for this owl has not been fully worked out. While recognized as a distinct species by the IOU, others consider it a subspecies of either the Sulawesi scops owl or the Moluccan scops owl, and analysis in 2020 found it to be closest in morphology to the Sangihe scops owl.

New research published in October 2026 has now shown that the originally reported type locality of Siau Island is erroneous, with the specimen collected elsewhere, on either Sangir Island or Manado in Sulawesi, locations from which other specimens in the same consignment of bird skins sent to Schlegel were included; and that there is now no evidence for the occurrence of any scops owl on Siau at any time.

On 14 December 2017, a video of a purported Siau scops owl trapped in a building was uploaded to YouTube (see external links). Although it has been the subject of debate, the scientific community has not been able to confirm the bird's identification; it is now rejected as erroneous or fraudulent.
