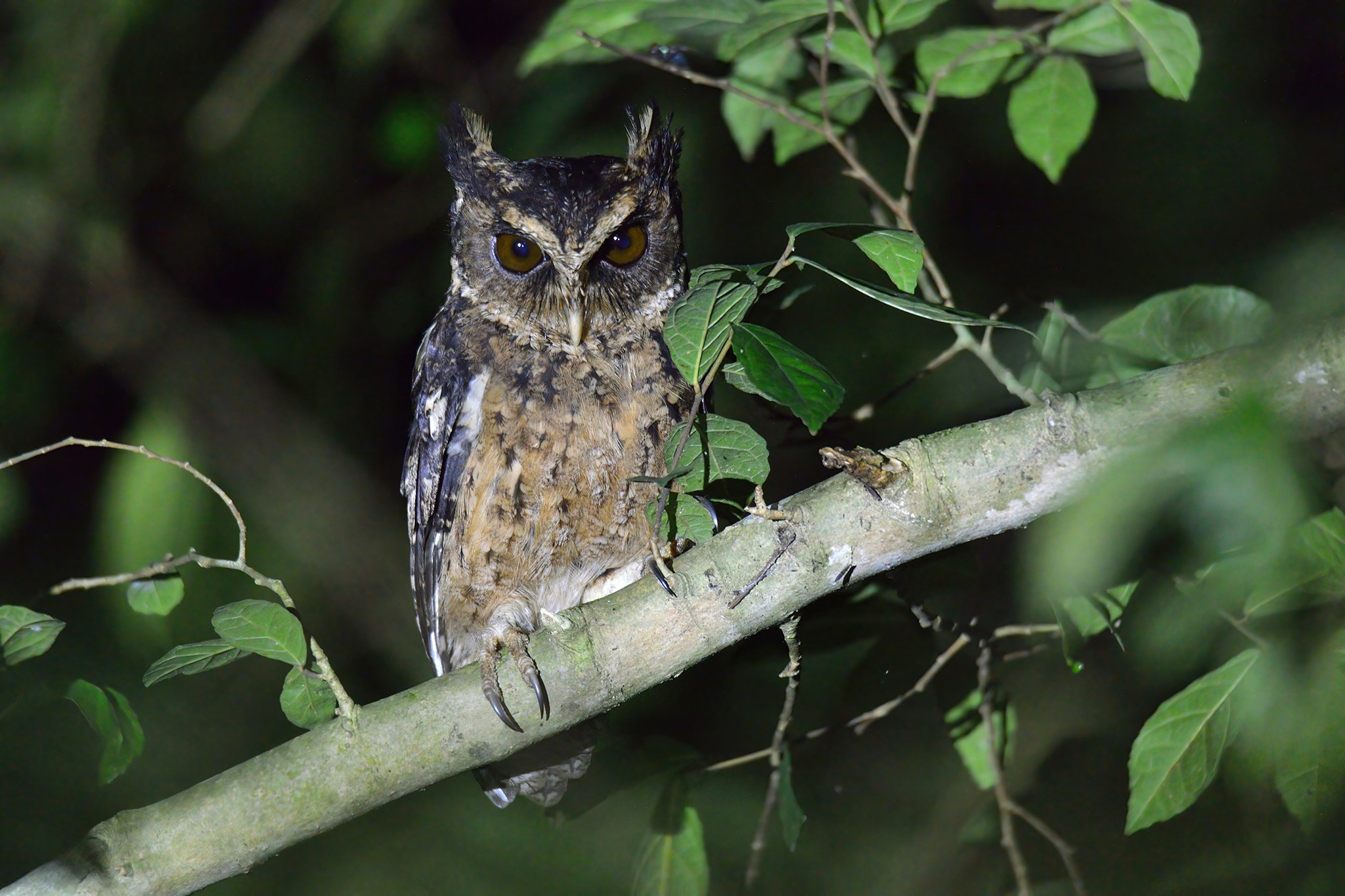

Conservation status
- Least Concern (IUCN 3.1)
- CITES Appendix II

Scientific classification
- Kingdom: Animalia
- Phylum: Chordata
- Class: Aves
- Order: Strigiformes
- Family: Strigidae
- Genus: Otus
- Species: O. fuliginosus

Binomial name
- Otus fuliginosus (Sharpe, 1888)

= Palawan scops owl =

Species of owl

The Palawan scops owl (Otus fuliginosus) is an owl endemic to the Philippines only being found on the island of Palawan. It is found on tropical moist lowland forest. It is threatened by habitat loss.

== Description and taxonomy ==
O. fuliginosus is a small owl, with a mean length of 19 - 20 cm. This species displays large ear tufts, and is generally brown to rufous-brown, interspersed with black vermiculation.

It was once believed to be a subspecies of the Indian scops owl (Otus bakkamoena), along with the collared scops owl (O. lettia). The species were split due to differences vocalization and well as phylogenetic analyses.

== Ecology and behavior ==
Not much is known about this owl but they are presumed to have similar habits to other closely related scops owls. Their diet is presumed to be insects, small mammals, reptiles, and amphibians.

They are presumed to live alone or in monogamous pairs and nests in tree hollows. Birds in breeding condition with enlarged gonads collected in April. Type specimen was a juvenile taken in July.

== Habitat and conservation status ==
Its habitat is in tropical moist lowland primary and secondary forest and even mixed cultivated areas – as long as there are still trees.

IUCN previously assessed this bird as near threatened with a population estimate of 10,000 to 19,999 mature individuals. However, the species was downlisted to least-concern in its 2023 assessment while retaining the same rough population estimate, and a declining population. This downlisting is not a result of this species increasing in number, but rather its demonstrated tolerance to disturbed, secondary forest habitat (i.e., the species' rate of decline is slower than previously expected, when population decline was directly associated with the loss of primary forests). This species' main threat is habitat loss with wholesale clearance of forest habitats as a result of legal and illegal logging, mining and conversion into farmlands through slash-and-burn or other methods.
