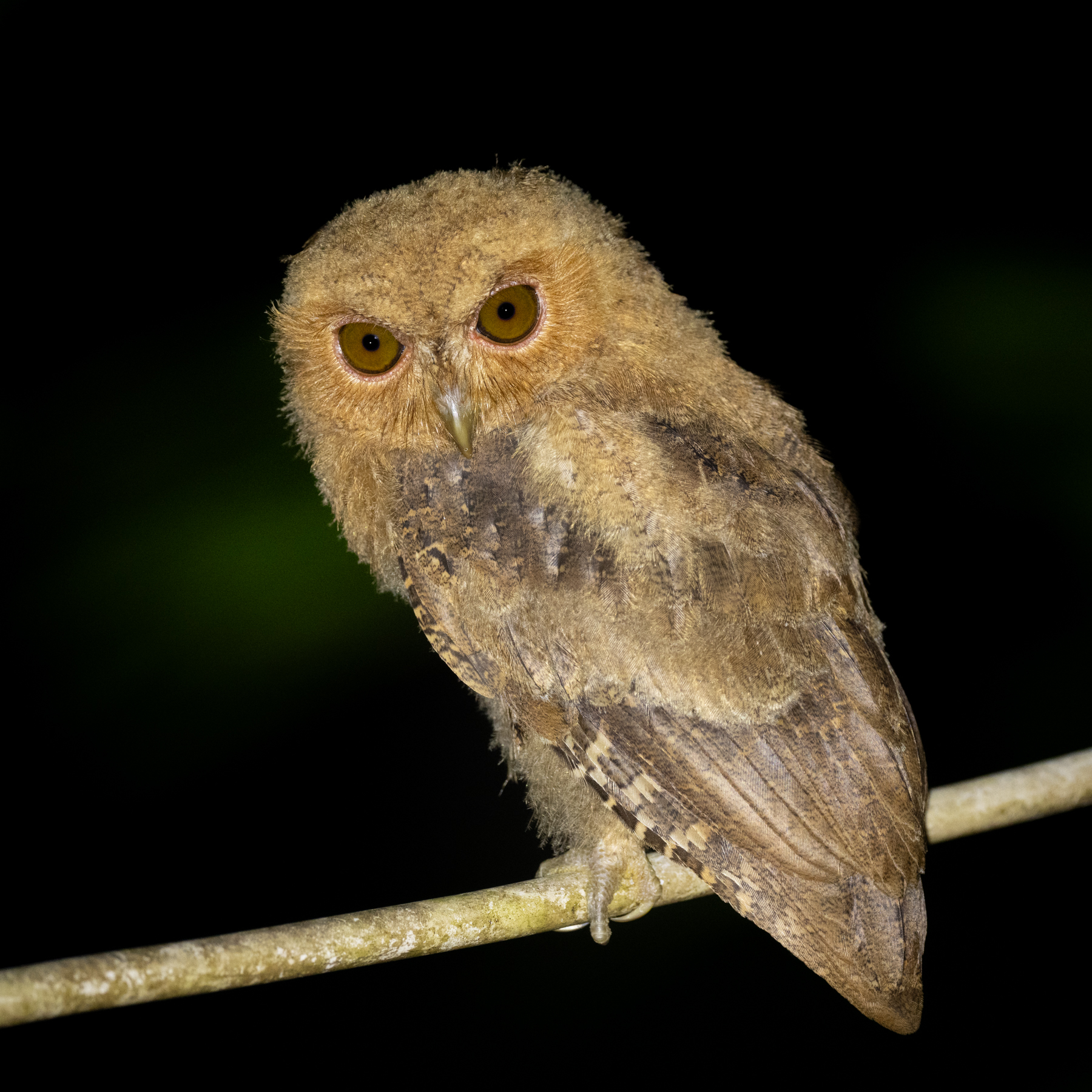

Conservation status
- Least Concern (IUCN 3.1)
- CITES Appendix II

Scientific classification
- Kingdom: Animalia
- Phylum: Chordata
- Class: Aves
- Order: Strigiformes
- Family: Strigidae
- Genus: Otus
- Species: O. mentawi

Binomial name
- Otus mentawi Chasen & Kloss, 1926

= Mentawai scops owl =

The Mentawai scops owl (Otus mentawi) is an owl species endemic to the larger Mentawai islands, off west Sumatra, Indonesia.

== Description ==
====== Measurements: ======
Total 22cm, tail 66mm-84mm, wing 157mm-166mm

=== Adult ===
This species comes in two feather morphs differing only by their main color: the Rufous-brown morph and the Blackish-brown morph. The facial disc follows this main color and is bordered by black-tipped feathers. They have pale buff eyebrows with dark mottling, and their ear tufts are of the same color, although not very prominent. The upper part of the body follows the main color, although darker on the crown and the nape, and dark shaft-streaks are noticeable on the back. They have no nuchal color, but some of those feathers have small white dots. The outer scapular feathers have a row of black and white patches, and the wing coverts are freckled with dark brown. The under part of the body is paler in the Blackish-brown morph and chestnut in the Rufous-brown morph. The herringbone shows shaft markings enclosed by single or paired white ocelli, and the main color pales as it descends towards the belly. The tarsus is feathered up to the toe, which is bare. Its irises range from yellow to brown and its bill is between olive and gray.

=== Juvenile ===
The only two described juveniles had a pale greyish-brown underpart, along with thin dark streaks. Their faces and breast were reddish-brown, with the face darker, although these colors seem to align as they grow. Their eyes were reddish, and their bill and toes were gray. Their wings also projected further than their small dark tail.

== Taxonomy ==
This owl was first observed and classified as a subspecies of Otus bakkamoena in 1926 by Chasen and Boden Kloss. In 1978, Joe T. Marshall reconsidered it as its own species because of its unique vocalization and its status has not changed since.

== Distribution and habitat ==
The Mentawai scops owl is endemic to the Mentawai islands, with confirmed sightings only on the largest islands of the archipelago: Siberut, Sipora, and South Pagai. Its estimated total habitat covers 14,110km^{2} and its population was estimated to be between 10,000 and 19,999.

On these islands, these owls inhabit a variety of environments, mostly observed in secondary forests and swamp forests along the coasts, or inside villages.

== Behavior ==
The Mentawai scops owl is nocturnal and its behavior seems to differ between forest residents and village residents, as the latter are less shy and have been reported to be remarkably tame or to perch on bare limbs. They are also easily attracted by imitations of their vocalizations or ‘pishing’.

=== Vocalizations ===
The vocalizations of this owl are said to be typical of Scops owls, as it consists of a series of hoots spaced 3-4s apart, each slightly rising in pitch. These hoots can be individual, double, or triple. Often, the male starts this call, and the female will duet with him, by following its phrases with a higher pitch, often adding notes, slowing down, becoming gruffier and fading at the end. Every hour or so, they emit a loud bold rising cry that can be broken in two as “PO-PO”, from which its local name comes.

=== Diet ===
Although feeding observation are scarce due to its nocturnal behavior, Mentawai scops owl are said to be insectivores, notably grasshoppers or katydids. They have been reported hunting from exposed perches in open areas in forests, agricultural lands and scrubs, as well as foraging on the ground.

=== Reproduction ===
Not much is known about the reproductive behavior of this species, but a female was observed raising its two juveniles alone after the parent male was killed. The adult would call from high in a tree and the juveniles would answer from lower branches, and they would emit a harsh cricket-like sound when the mother delivered food.
