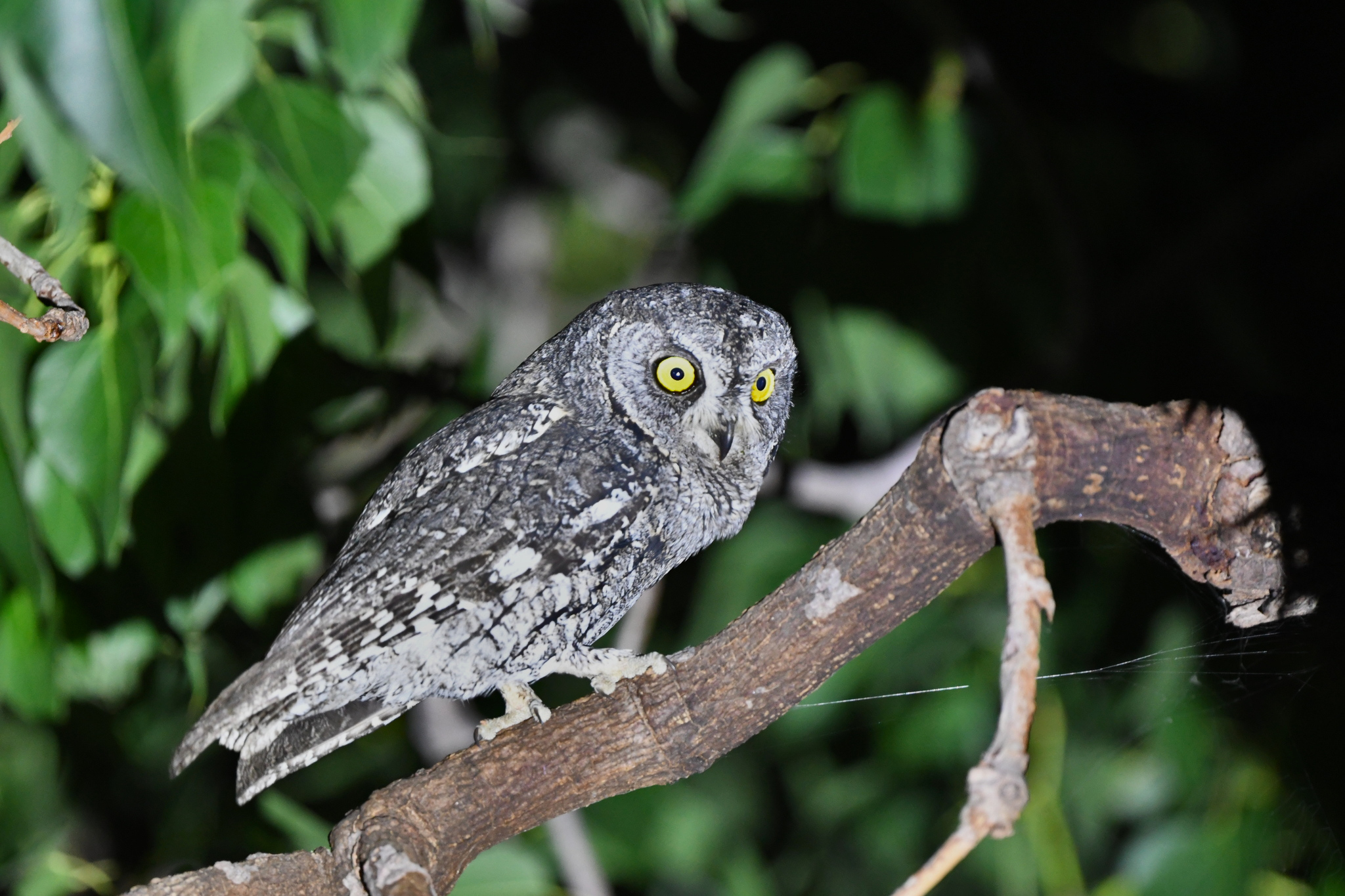
- Otus cyprius, photographed in Peyia

Conservation status
- Least Concern (IUCN 3.1)
- CITES Appendix II (CITES)

Scientific classification
- Kingdom: Animalia
- Phylum: Chordata
- Class: Aves
- Order: Strigiformes
- Family: Strigidae
- Genus: Otus
- Species: O. cyprius

Binomial name
- Otus cyprius (Madarász, G, 1901)

Synonyms
- Otus scops cyprius

= Cyprus scops owl =

Species of owl

The Cyprus scops owl (Otus cyprius) is a small owl endemic to Cyprus.

== Taxonomy and systematics ==
It is similar to the Eurasian scops owl Otus scops, with which it was once considered conspecific. The Cyprus scops owl differs from Eurasian scops owl in that it has a double noted song (vs. single noted), it lacks a rufous morph (vs. has a rufous morph), and that it shows consistent plumage differences (with Cyprus scops owl appearing darker than Eurasian scops owls). There are limited mitochondrial DNA differences between the Cyprus scops owl and the Eurasian scops owl, but the taxa appear to occupy wholly discrete breeding ranges despite temporary sympatry during migration.

== Distribution and habitat ==
The Cyprus scops owl is endemic to the island of Cyprus. It is reported in the literature to occur in rural areas, woodlands, and forests on the island from sea level up to 1,900 metres (6,200 ft). Considering the highest point on the island is only 1,952 metres (6,404 ft) at Mt. Olympus and that there are records of this species near the summit, the species distribution encompasses virtually the entire island.

=== Reports from the mainland ===
Recordings of similar-sounding owls in adjacent mainland Israel have been attributed to this species, but the current taxonomic status of these mainland populations is not known.

== Behavior and ecology ==
=== Breeding ===
The species nests in natural cavities, in cavities in buildings, and in artificial nest boxes. In a study using nest-boxes, the highest levels of nest-box occupancy were found near forest edge and in rural areas, although the species can be found in most habitats on the island below 1900 m. The nesting habits of these species are of particular interest, as this is a cavity-nesting endemic species on an island that lacks any species of woodpeckers, and Calabrian pines Pinus brutia "rarely develop cavities until [they are] old".

== Relationship to humans ==
This species occurs in rural areas, occasionally nesting in buildings and regularly utilizing nest-boxes provided for the species.

== Status ==
It is a species of Least Concern.
