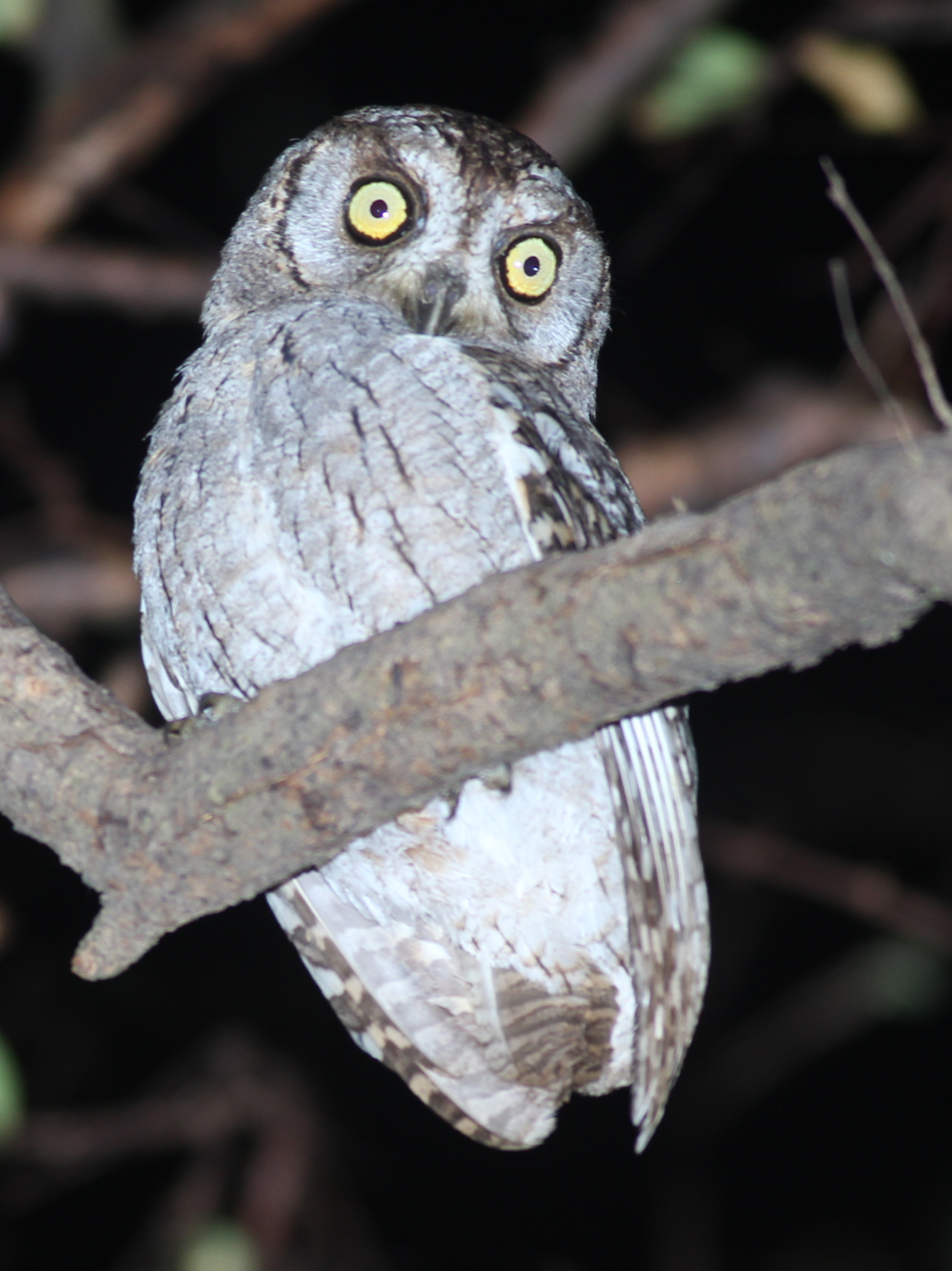

Conservation status
- Least Concern (IUCN 3.1)
- CITES Appendix II

Scientific classification
- Kingdom: Animalia
- Phylum: Chordata
- Class: Aves
- Order: Strigiformes
- Family: Strigidae
- Genus: Otus
- Species: O. pamelae

Binomial name
- Otus pamelae Bates, GL, 1937

= Arabian scops owl =

Species of owl

The Arabian scops owl (Otus pamelae) is a small owl endemic to Saudi Arabia, Oman, and Yemen. The current population of the species is estimated to be about 60,000 individuals.
