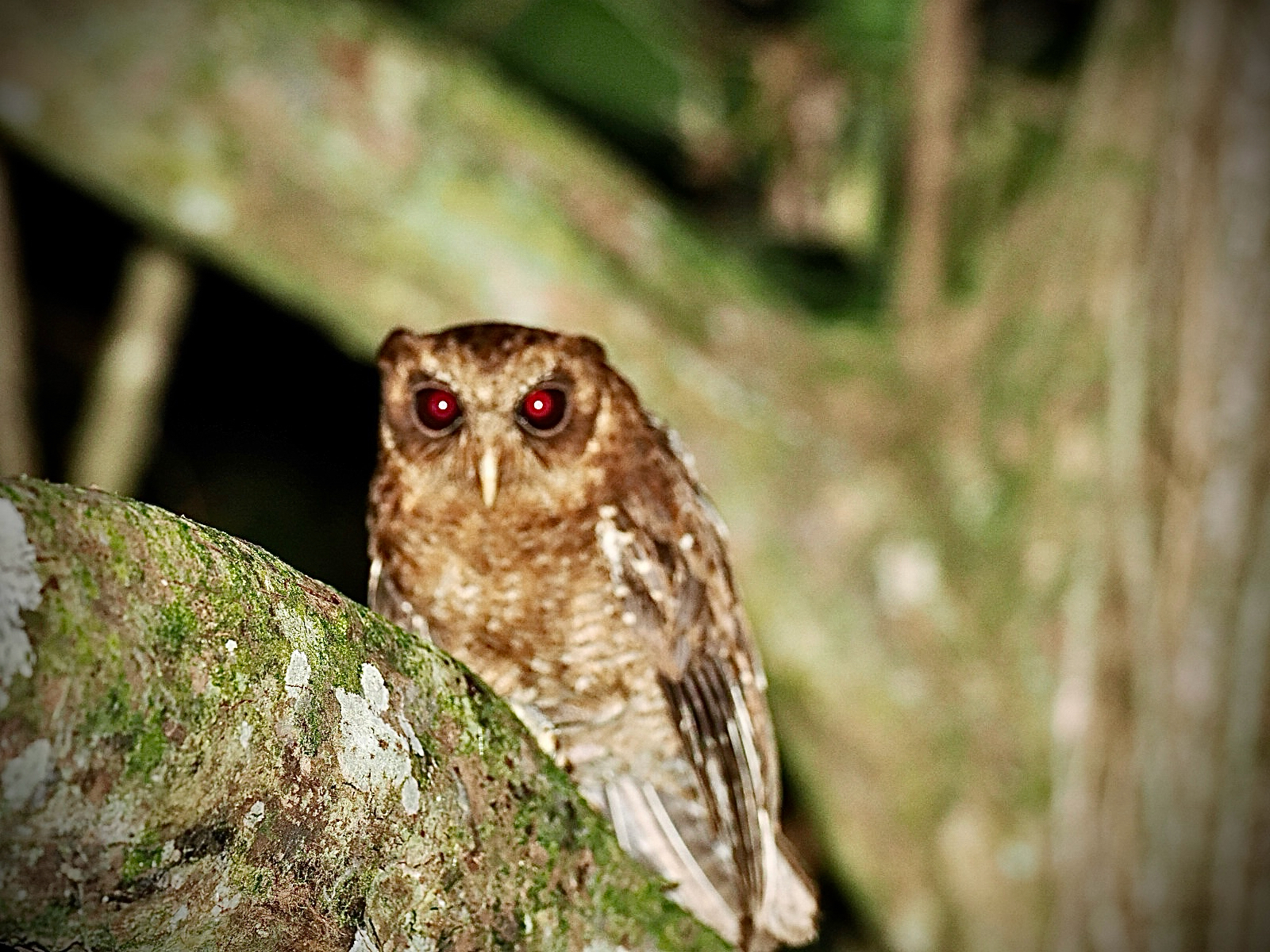

Conservation status
- Least Concern (IUCN 3.1)
- CITES Appendix II

Scientific classification
- Kingdom: Animalia
- Phylum: Chordata
- Class: Aves
- Order: Strigiformes
- Family: Strigidae
- Genus: Otus
- Species: O. podarginus

Binomial name
- Otus podarginus (Hartlaub & Finsch, 1872)

Synonyms
- Otus podarginus; Pyrroglaux podargina; Pyrroglaux podarginus

= Palau scops owl =

Species of owl

The Palau scops owl or Palau owl (Otus podarginus) is a species of owl in the family Strigidae. Palau scops owls are dark reddish-brown with small white dots scattered across their feathers. They are endemic to the Palau Islands in the western Pacific, where they are found in woodland and lagoon trees, ravines and mangrove swamps. Palau owls nest in hollows of trees, live in groups and are territorial.

The Palau scops owl was formerly placed in the monotypic genus Pyrroglaux. It was moved to Otus based on the results of a molecular phylogenetic study published in 2019.
