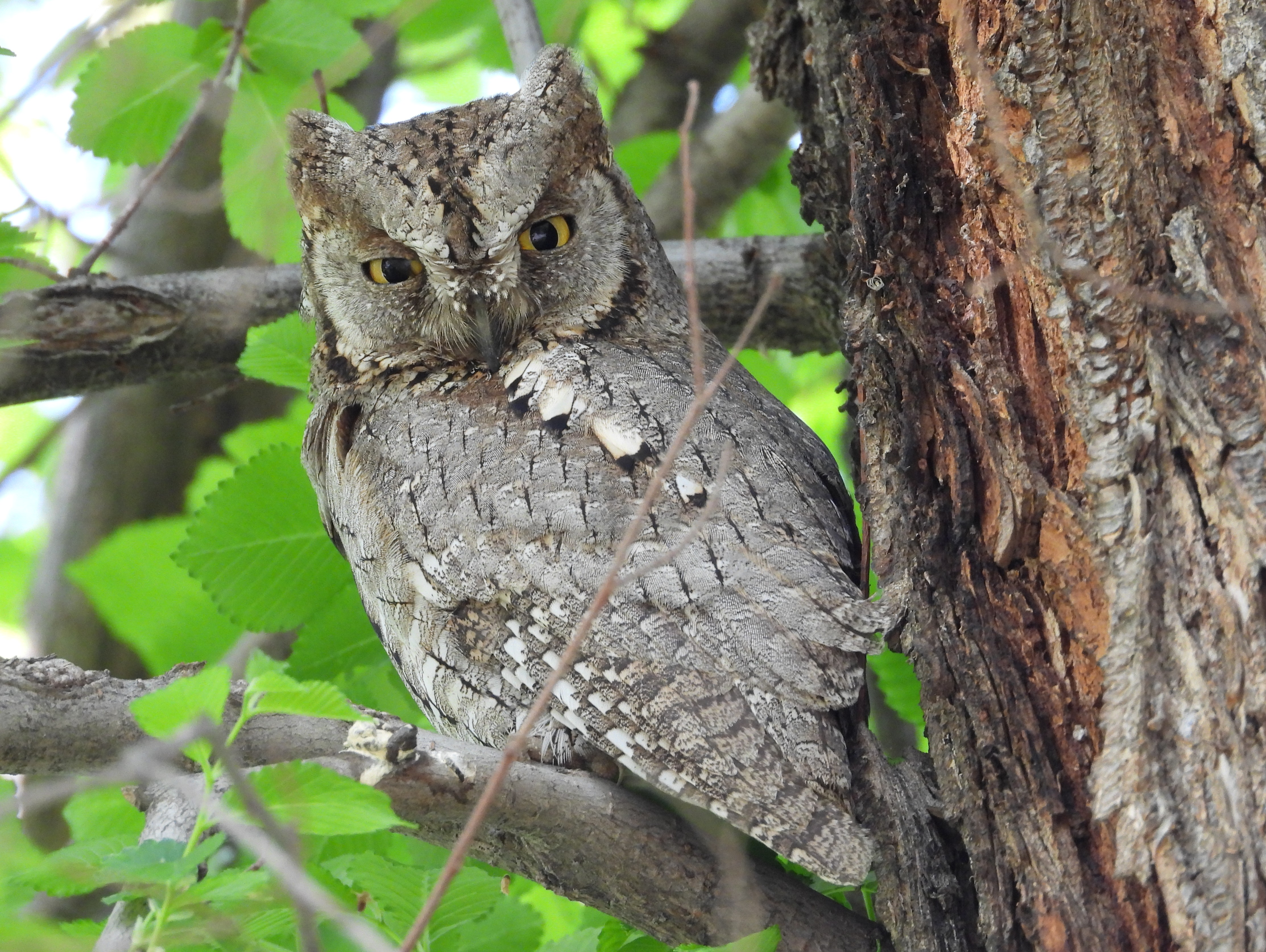
- Eurasian scops owls, Otus scops

Scientific classification
- Kingdom: Animalia
- Phylum: Chordata
- Class: Aves
- Order: Strigiformes
- Family: Strigidae
- Genus: Otus; Pennant, 1769

Type species
- Otus bakkamoena Pennant, 1769

Synonyms
- Scops Savigny, 1809 (non Moehring, 1758, Brünnich, 1772: preoccupied); Scopus Oken 1817 (non Brisson, 1760: preoccupied)

= Scops owl =

Scops owls

Genus of birds

Scops owls are typical owls in family Strigidae belonging to the genus Otus and are restricted to the Old World. Otus is the largest genus of owls with 59 species. Scops owls are coloured in various brownish hues, sometimes with a lighter underside and face, which helps to camouflage them against the bark of trees. Some are polymorphic, occurring in a greyish- and a reddish-brown morph. They are compact in size and shape. Female scops owls are usually larger than males.

== Taxonomy ==
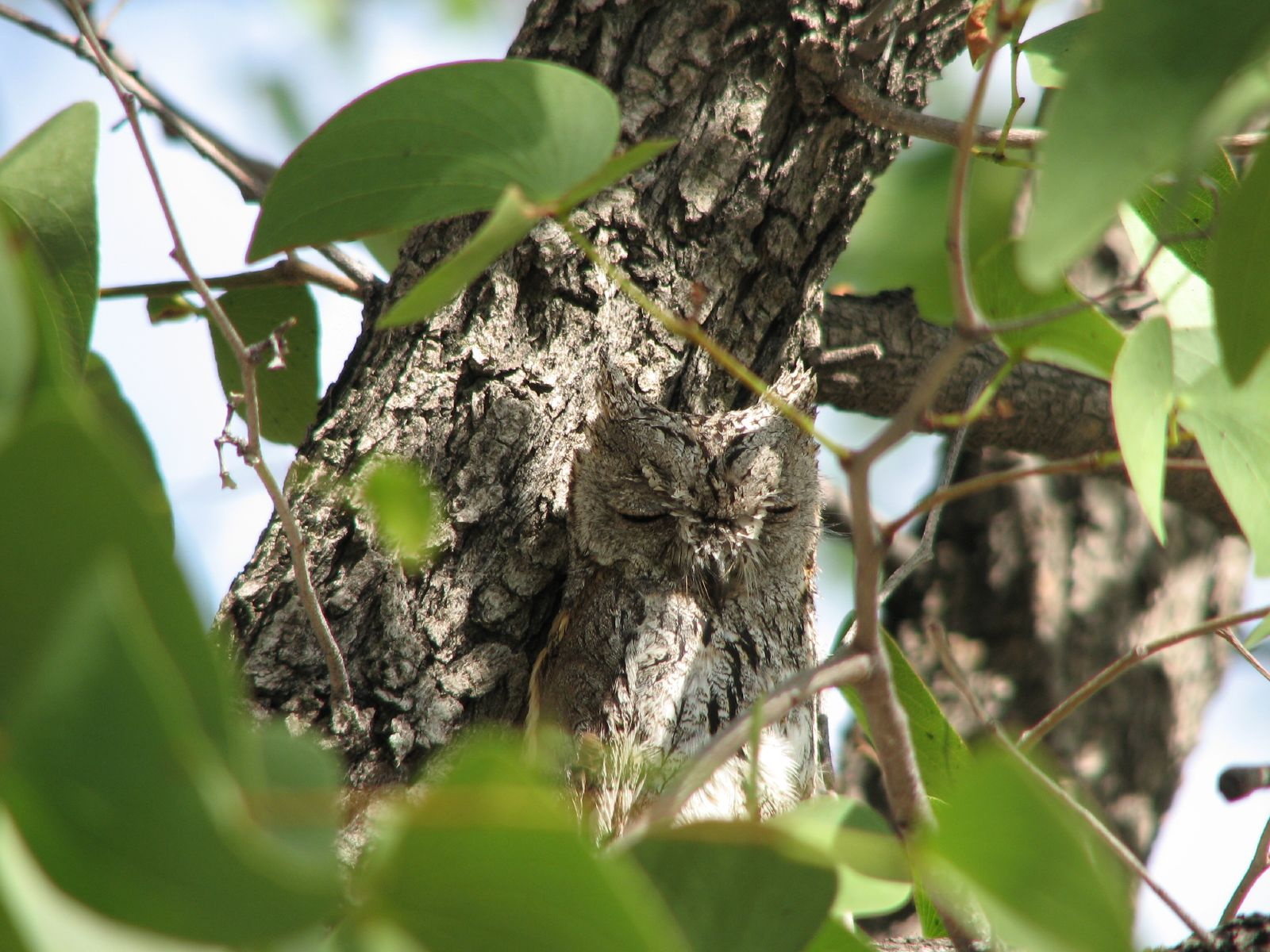
A well-camouflaged African scops owl (Otus senegalensis)

The genus Otus was introduced in 1769 by the Welsh naturalist Thomas Pennant for the Indian scops owl (O. bakkamoena). The name is derived from the Latin word otus and the Greek word ὦτος ōtos meaning horned or eared owl (cf. οὖς, GEN ὠτός, "ear"). The generic name Scops that was proposed by Marie Jules César Savigny in 1809 is a junior synonym and is derived from the Greek σκώψ (skōps) meaning small kind of owl, Otus scops.

By the mid-19th century, it was becoming clear that Otus encompassed more than one genus. First, in 1848, the screech owls were split off as Megascops. The white-faced owls of Africa, with their huge eyes and striking facial coloration, were separated in Ptilopsis in 1851. In 1854, the highly apomorphic white-throated screech owl of the Andes was placed in the monotypic genus Macabra. Gymnasio was established in the same year for the Puerto Rican owl, and the bare-legged owl (or "Cuban screech owl") was separated in Gymnoglaux the following year; the latter genus was sometimes merged with Gymnasio by subsequent authors. The Palau scops owl, described only in 1872 and little-known to this day, was eventually separated in Pyrroglaux by Yoshimaro Yamashina in 1938.

In the early 20th century, the lumping-together of taxa had come to be preferred. The 3rd edition of the AOU checklist in 1910 placed the screech owls back in Otus. Although this move was never unequivocally accepted, it was the dominant treatment throughout most of the 20th century. In 1988 it was attempted to resolve this by re-establishing all those genera split some 140 years earlier at subgenus rank inside Otus. Still, the diversity and distinctness of the group failed to come together in a good evolutionary and phylogenetic picture, and it was not until the availability of DNA sequence data that this could be resolved. In 1999, a preliminary study of mtDNA cytochrome b across a wide range of owls found that even the treatment as subgenera was probably unsustainable and suggested that most of the genera proposed around 1850 should be accepted. Though there was some debate about the reliability of these findings at first, they have been confirmed by subsequent studies. In 2003, the AOU formally re-accepted the genus Megascops again.

=== Species ===
The genus Otus contains 58 species (including 3 extinct species):

- Giant scops owl, Otus gurneyi
- White-fronted scops owl, Otus sagittatus
- Reddish scops owl, Otus rufescens
- Serendib scops owl, Otus thilohoffmanni
- Sandy scops owl, Otus icterorhynchus
- Sokoke scops owl, Otus ireneae
- Andaman scops owl, Otus balli
- Flores scops owl, Otus alfredi
- Mountain scops owl, Otus spilocephalus
- Javan scops owl, Otus angelinae
- Mindanao scops owl, Otus mirus
- Luzon scops owl, Otus longicornis
- Mindoro scops owl, Otus mindorensis
- São Tomé scops owl, Otus hartlaubi
- Torotoroka scops owl, Otus madagascariensis – formerly included in O. rutilus
- Rainforest scops owl, Otus rutilus
- Mayotte scops owl, Otus mayottensis – formerly included in O. rutilus
- Karthala scops owl, Otus pauliani
- Anjouan scops owl, Otus capnodes
- Moheli scops owl, Otus moheliensis
- † Réunion scops owl, Otus grucheti – extinct, formerly placed in the genus Mascarenotus
- † Mauritius scops owl, Otus sauzieri – extinct, formerly placed in the genus Mascarenotus
- † Rodrigues scops owl, Otus murivorus – extinct, formerly placed in the genus Mascarenotus
- Pemba scops owl, Otus pembaensis
- Eurasian scops owl, Otus scops
- Cyprus scops owl, Otus cyprius – formerly included in O. scops
- Pallid scops owl, Otus brucei
- Arabian scops owl, Otus pamelae
- African scops owl, Otus senegalensis – includes Annobón scops owl as O. s. feae
- Socotra scops owl, Otus socotranus
- Oriental scops owl, Otus sunia
- Ryūkyū scops owl, Otus elegans
- Moluccan scops owl, Otus magicus
- Wetar scops owl, Otus tempestatis
- Sula scops owl, Otus sulaensis
- Biak scops owl, Otus beccarii
- Sulawesi scops owl, Otus manadensis
- Banggai scops owl, Otus mendeni
- Siau scops owl, Otus siaoensis
- Sangihe scops owl, Otus collari
- Mantanani scops owl, Otus mantananensis
- Seychelles scops owl, Otus insularis
- Nicobar scops owl, Otus alius
- Simeulue scops owl, Otus umbra
- Enggano scops owl, Otus enganensis
- Mentawai scops owl, Otus mentawi
- Rajah scops owl, Otus brookii
- Indian scops owl, Otus bakkamoena
- Collared scops owl, Otus lettia – formerly included in O. bakkamoena
- Japanese scops owl, Otus semitorques – formerly included in O. bakkamoena
- Sunda scops owl, Otus lempiji – formerly included in O. bakkamoena
- Philippine scops owl, Otus megalotis
- Negros scops owl, Otus nigrorum – formerly included in O. megalotis
- Everett's scops owl, Otus everetti – formerly included in O. megalotis
- Palawan scops owl, Otus fuliginosus
- Wallace's scops owl, Otus silvicola
- Rinjani scops owl, Otus jolandae
- Palau scops owl, Otus podarginus – formerly placed in the monotypic genus Pyrroglaux
- Principe scops owl, Otus bikegila

Two extinct species are sometimes placed in the genus:

- † Madeiran scops owl, Otus mauli (extinct, c. 15th century)
- † São Miguel scops owl, Otus frutuosoi (extinct, c. 15th century)

An apparent Otus owl was heard calling at about 1,000 meters ASL south of the summit of Camiguin in the Philippines on May 14, 1994. No scops owls had previously known from this island, and given that new species of Otus are occasionally discovered, it may have been an undescribed taxon.

In July 2016, an unknown Otus species was photographed on the island of Príncipe in the Gulf of Guinea. The image was published on Ornithomedia. Dubbed Otus bikegila, it was formally described in 2022.

=== Formerly placed here ===
As noted above, the fossil record of scops owls gives an incomplete picture of their evolution at present. While older sources cite many species of supposed extinct Otus (or "Scops"), these are now placed in entirely different genera:

- "Otus" henrici was a barn owl of the genus Selenornis
- "Otus" providentiae was a burrowing owl, probably a paleosubspecies
- "Otus" wintershofensis may be close to extant genus Ninox and some material assigned to it belongs into Intutula
- "Scops" commersoni is a junior synonym of the recently extinct Mauritius owl, referring to pictures and descriptions which mention ear tufts; the subfossil material of this species had been erroneously assigned to tuftless owls.

== Evolution ==
The evolutionary relationships of the scops and screech owls are not entirely clear. What is certain is that they are very closely related; they may be considered sister lineages which fill essentially the same ecological niche in their allopatric ranges. A screech-owl fossil from the Late Pliocene of Kansas – which is almost identical to eastern and western screech owls – indicate a long-standing presence of these birds in the Americas, while coeval scops owl fossils very similar to the Eurasian scops-owl have been found at S'Onix on the Spanish island Mallorca. The scops and screech owl lineage probably evolved at some time during the Miocene (like most other genera of typical owls), and the three (see below) modern lineages separated perhaps roughly 5 million years ago. Note that there is no reliable estimate of divergence time, as Otus and Megascops are osteologically very similar, as is to be expected from a group that has apparently conserved its ecomorphology since before its evolutionary radiation. As almost all scops and screech owls today, their common ancestor was in all probability already a small owl, with ear tufts and at least the upper tarsus ("leg") feathered.

However that may be, the hypothesis that the group evolved from Old World stock is tentatively supported by cytochrome b sequence data.

== Ecology and behaviour ==
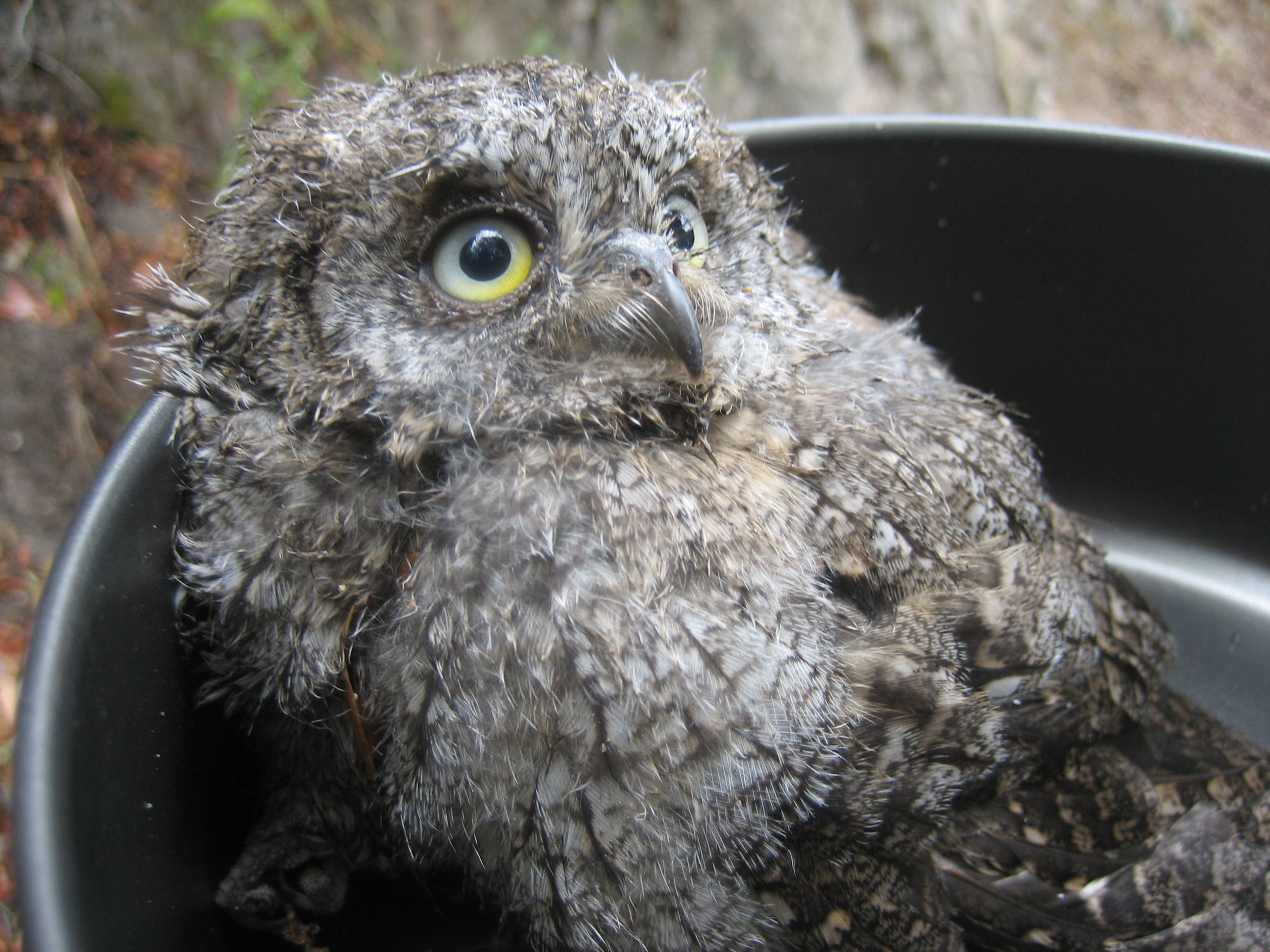
A fledgling Eurasian scops owl, Otus scops

Call of oriental scops owl (Otus sunia)
Recorded in Parambikulam (India)

While late 19th-century ornithologists knew little of the variation of these cryptic birds which often live in far-off places, with every new taxon being described a few differences between the Old and New World "scops" owls became more and more prominent. Namely, the scops owls give a whistling call or a row of high-pitched hoots with less than four individual hoots per second. This call is given in social interaction or when the owl tries to scare away other animals. The screech owls on the other hand are named for their piercing trills of more than four individual notes per second. They also have a kind of song, which is a short sequence of varying calls given by the males when they try to attract females to their nests, or between members of a pair. There are a few other differences such as the screech owls almost never being brown below which is common in scops owls, but the difference in vocalizations is most striking.

Scops owls hunt from perches in semi-open landscapes. They prefer areas which contain old trees with hollows; these are home to their prey which includes insects, reptiles, small mammals such as bats and mice and other small birds. The owls will also eat earthworms, amphibians and aquatic invertebrates. Scops owls have a good sense of hearing which helps them locate their prey in any habitat. They also possess well-developed raptorial claws and a curved bill, both of which are used for tearing their prey into pieces small enough to swallow easily.

Scops owls are primarily solitary birds. Most species lay and incubate their eggs in a cavity nest that was originally made by another animal. During the incubation period, the male will feed the female. These birds are monogamous, with biparental care, and only fledge one young per year. The young of most scops owls are altricial to semialtricial.

As opposed to screech owls, scops owls have only a single type of call. This consists of a series of whistles or high-pitched hoots, given with a frequency of 4 calls per second or less, or of a single, drawn-out whistle. Calls differ widely between species in type and pitch, and in the field are often the first indication of these birds' presence, as well as the most reliable means to distinguish between species. Some, like the recently described Serendib scops owl (Otus thilohoffmanni), were discovered because their vocalizations were unfamiliar to experts in birdcalls.

== See also ==
- Mascarene owls
