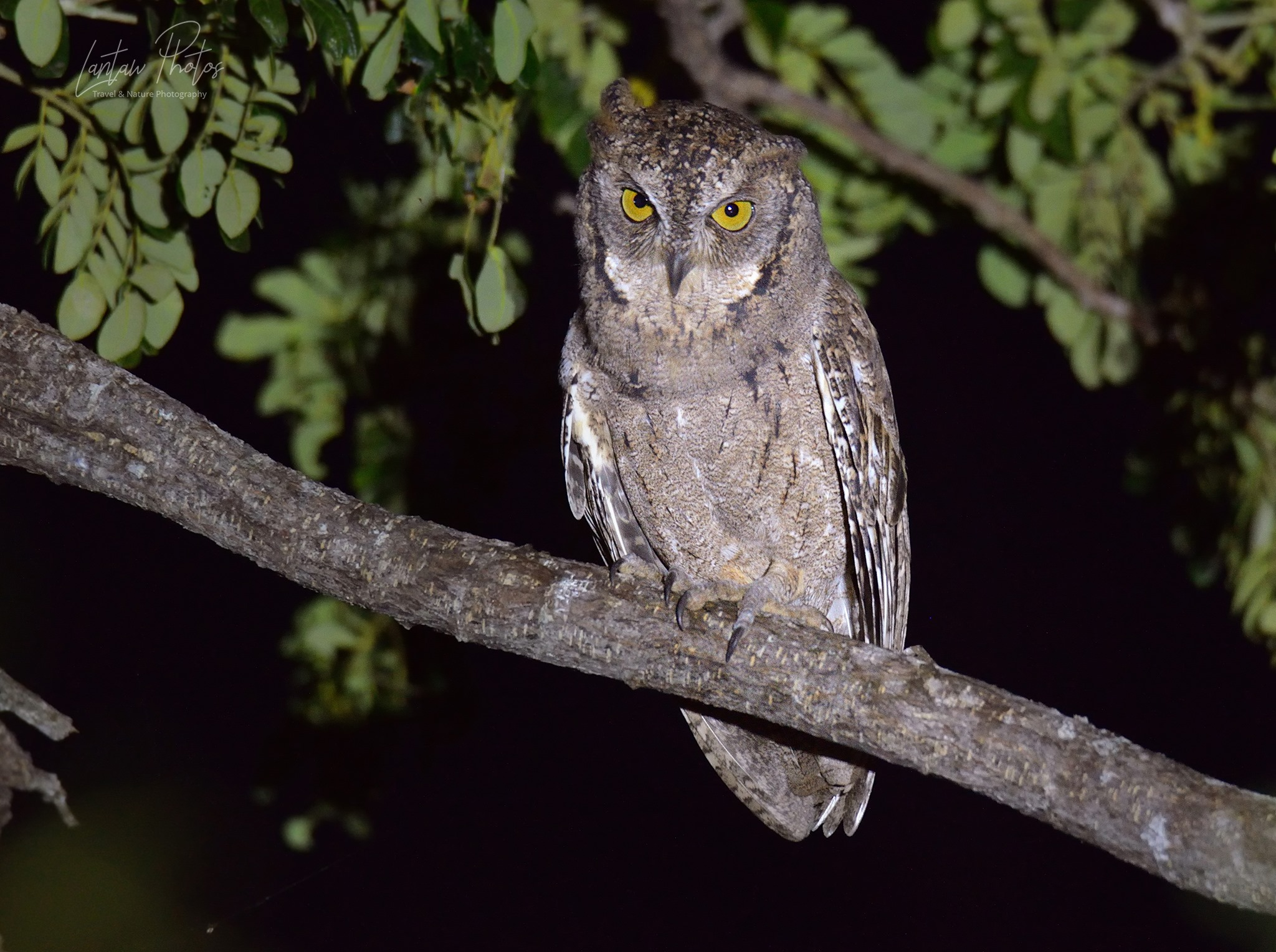

Conservation status
- Near Threatened (IUCN 3.1)
- CITES Appendix II

Scientific classification
- Kingdom: Animalia
- Phylum: Chordata
- Class: Aves
- Order: Strigiformes
- Family: Strigidae
- Genus: Otus
- Species: O. mantananensis

Binomial name
- Otus mantananensis (Sharpe, 1892)

= Mantanani scops owl =

Species of owl

The Mantanani scops owl (Otus mantananensis), is a small owl in the scops-owl genus Otus found on small islands between Borneo and the Philippines. It is listed by the IUCN as "near threatened" because its range is limited with its population being fragmented on several different islands, and its forest habitat is being degraded by ongoing logging and clearance.

== Description and Taxonomy ==
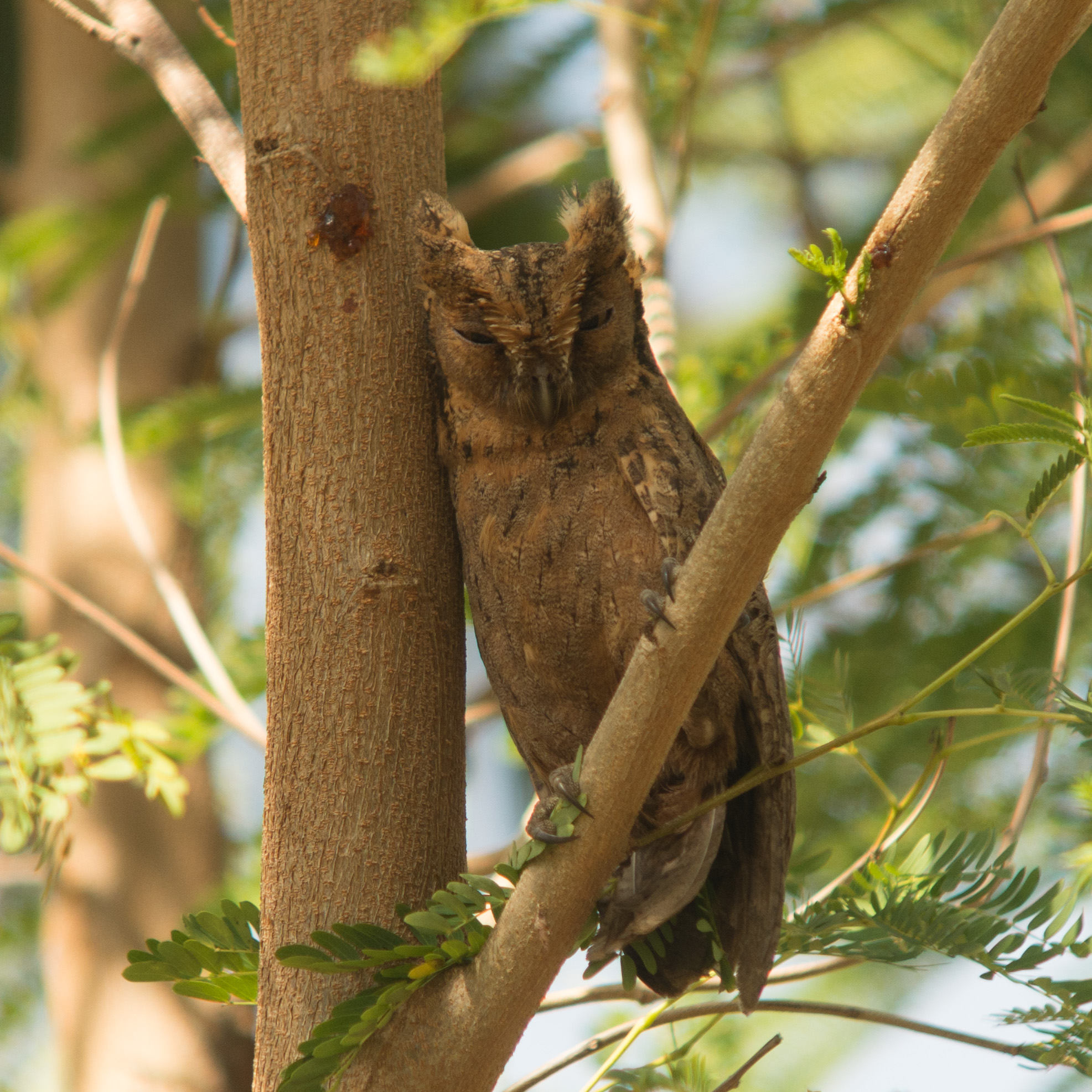
O. m. mantanensis in Palawan

This owl is about 18 cm long, with a wing length of about 15.5 cm. It has a buff facial disk with a narrow, dark border. It has dark brown upperparts with pale markings on the scapulars, and pale underparts with dark streaks and barring. It has yellow irides, grey feet and bill, and feathered tarsi.

This owl hunts at the forest edge or in clearings, feeding mainly on insects. It is thought to breed from March to May with its eggs being laid in a tree hollow. The voice has been described as a simple waa and a goose-like honk, with a descending series of short was during territorial disputes. The female's voice is lower and harsher than that of the male.

=== Subspecies ===
Four subspecies are recognized:

- O. m. mantanensis (Sharpe, RB, 1892) – Found in the surrounding islands of southern Palawan
- O. m. cuyensis McGregor, RC, 1904 – Found in Dicabaito, Linapacan and surrounding islands in the southern Calamian Islands
- O. m. romblonis McGregor, RC, 1905 – Found in Romblon, Tablas Island, Semirara Island, Sibuyan Island, Tres Reyes and Banton.
- O. m. sibutuensis (Sharpe, RB, 1893) – Found in the Sibutu Islands and Tumindao

== Habitat and Conservation Status ==
The Mantanani scops owl is endemic to small islands between the Malaysian state of Sabah in northern Borneo, such as the Mantanani group after which the species gets its common name, and the Philippines island of Palawan, including Calamien, Rasa and Ursula, as well as islands in the Sulu Archipelago and the central Philippines. It is fairly common in coconut groves and other wooded habitats, such as stands of Casuarina equisetifolia, though the total range size is small and estimated to be less than 2,000 km^{2} (772 sq mi).

The Mantanani scops owl is considered to be near threatened because it is confined to increasingly disturbed and degraded habitats within a small range. The BirdLife population estimate for the species over its entire range is 6,000 to 15,000 individuals and decreasing. Estimates for the population on Mantanani Island are for at least 100 birds.
