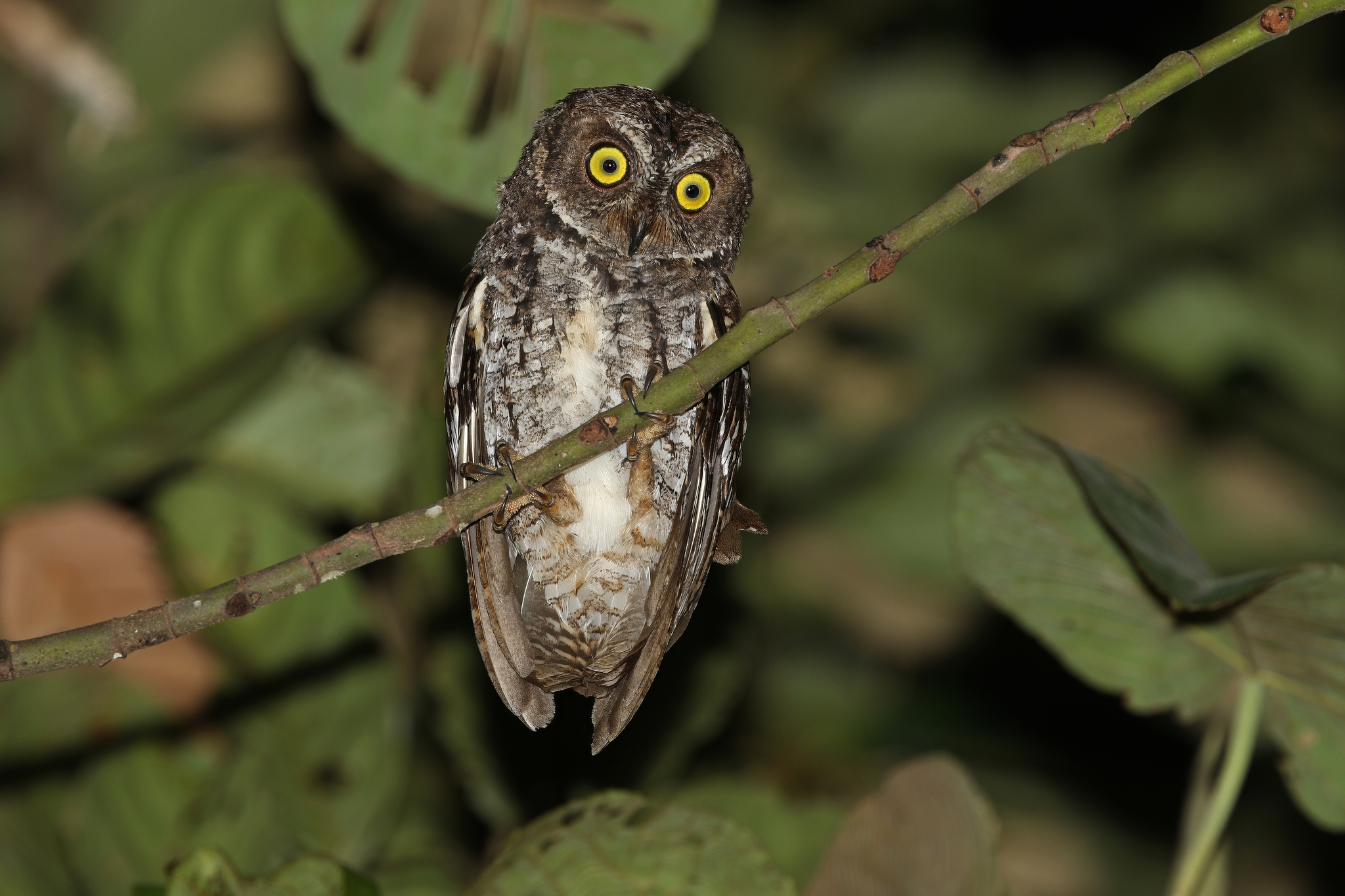

Conservation status
- Near Threatened (IUCN 3.1)
- CITES Appendix II

Scientific classification
- Kingdom: Animalia
- Phylum: Chordata
- Class: Aves
- Order: Strigiformes
- Family: Strigidae
- Genus: Otus
- Species: O. mendeni

Binomial name
- Otus mendeni Neumann, 1939

= Banggai scops owl =

Species of owl

The Banggai scops owl (Otus mendeni) is an owl found on Banggai Island in Indonesia.

It was formerly considered a subspecies of the Sulawesi scops owl (Otus manadensis), but was split as a distinct species by the IOC in 2021.
