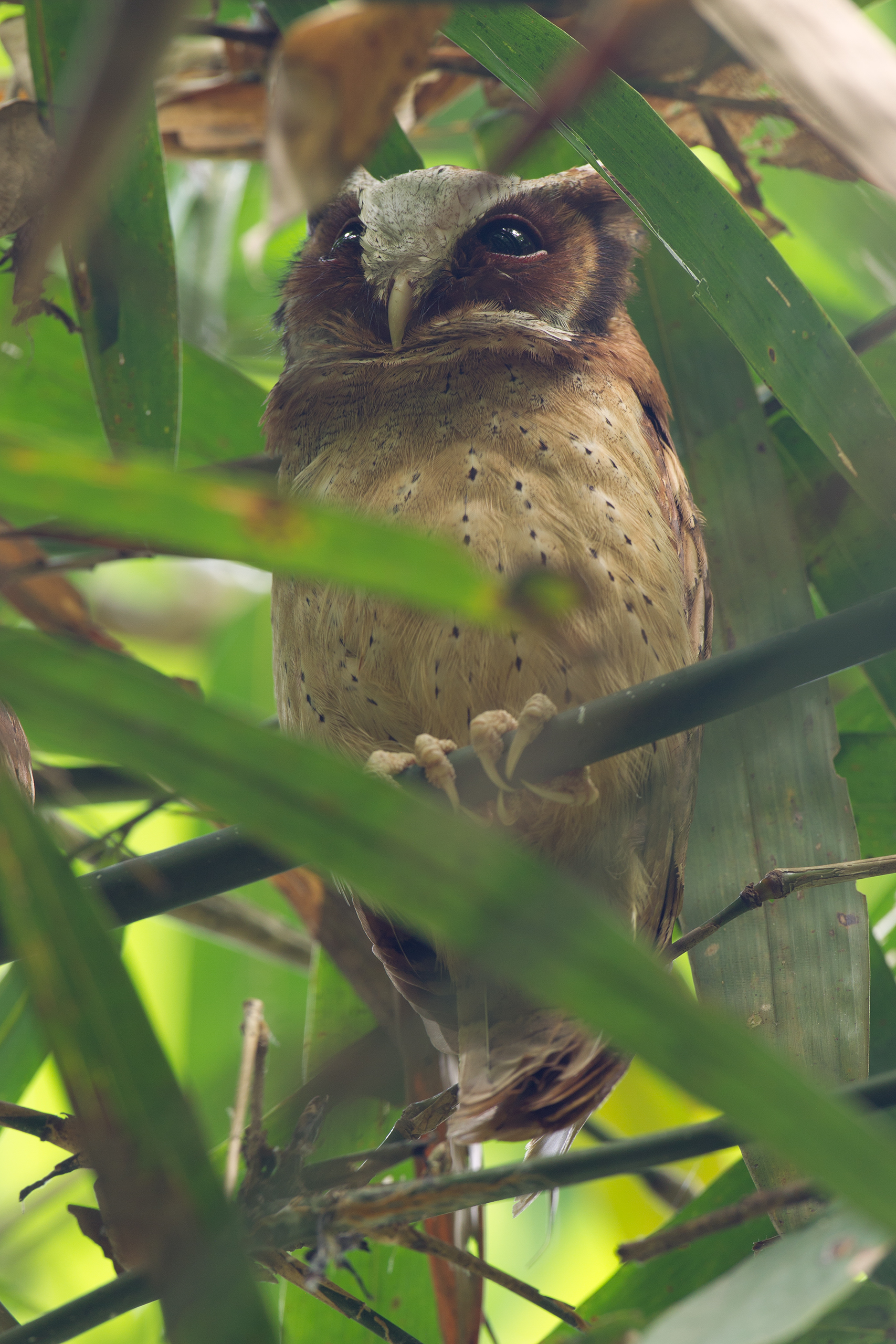

Conservation status
- Vulnerable (IUCN 3.1)
- CITES Appendix II

Scientific classification
- Kingdom: Animalia
- Phylum: Chordata
- Class: Aves
- Order: Strigiformes
- Family: Strigidae
- Genus: Otus
- Species: O. sagittatus

Binomial name
- Otus sagittatus (Cassin, 1849)

= White-fronted scops owl =

Species of owl

The white-fronted scops owl (Otus sagittatus) is a small Asian owl in the family Strigidae. It has a declining population about which little is known, and is dependent on lowland and foothill forests which are rapidly being destroyed. This species of owl is considered vulnerable and has a population of about 2,500–10,000. It is found in the west of Thailand and also in peninsular Malaysia. Its range covers 149,000 km^{2} (58,000 sq mi) of forest at altitudes of 0–700 m (0–2,300 ft) above sea-level.

The white-fronted scops owl was described by the American ornithologist John Cassin in 1849 and given the binomial name Ephialtes sagittatus. The species is monotypic.

This kind of owl has two modes of defense. The first is that it can puff up its feathers to triple its body size. The second is that it can stretch its body upwards and turn its head at an angle in the direction of the predator that it is hiding from, reducing visibility.
