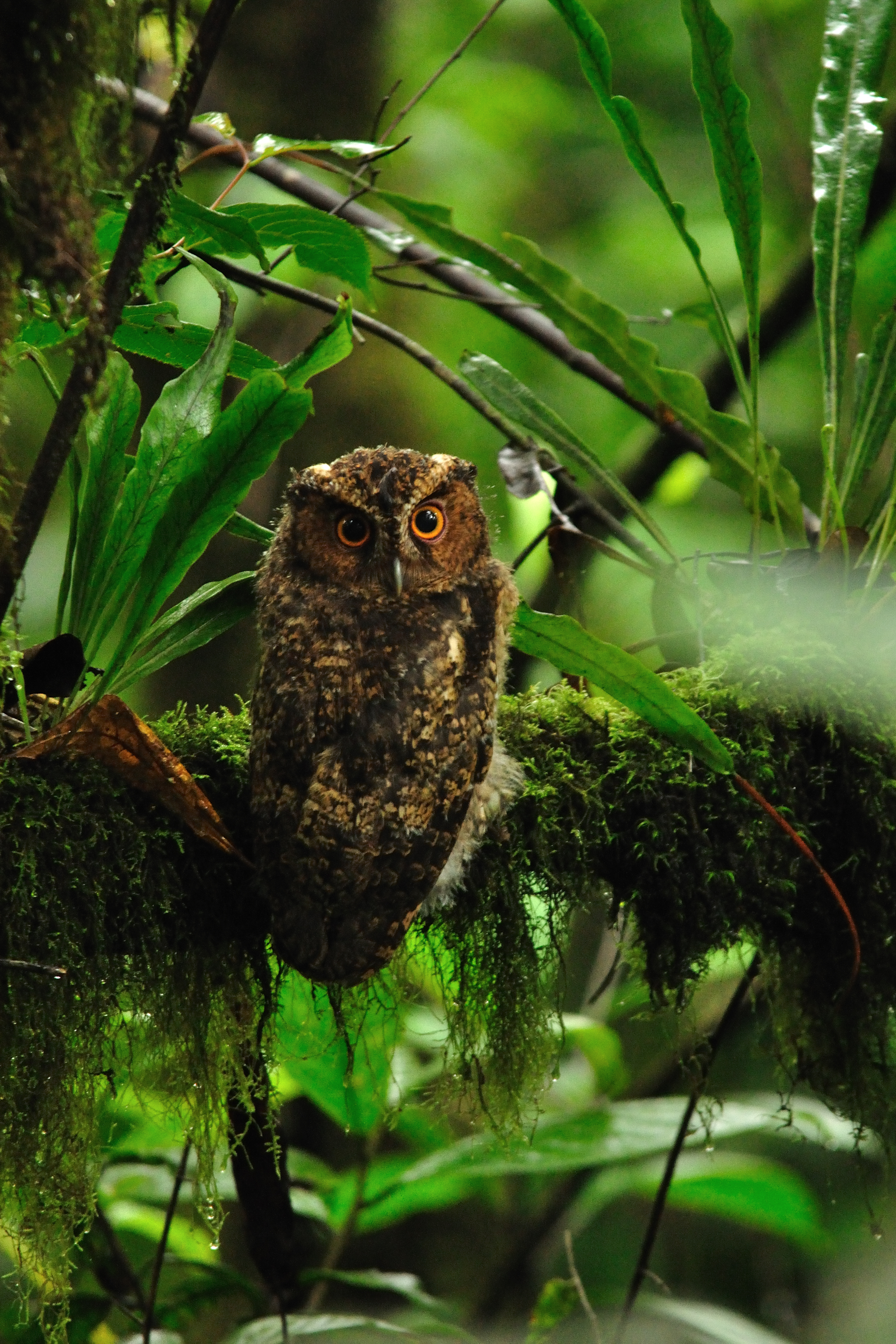
- Adult O. b. solokensis from Mt. Kerinci, Sumatra.

Conservation status
- Least Concern (IUCN 3.1)
- CITES Appendix II

Scientific classification
- Kingdom: Animalia
- Phylum: Chordata
- Class: Aves
- Order: Strigiformes
- Family: Strigidae
- Genus: Otus
- Species: O. brookii

Binomial name
- Otus brookii (Sharpe, 1892)

Subspecies
- O. b. brooki (Sharpe, 1892); O. b. solokensis (Hartert, 1893)

= Rajah scops owl =

Species of owl

The Rajah scops owl (Otus brookii) is a species of owl found on the islands of Borneo and Sumatra. The bird is named after James Brooke, Rajah of Sarawak. Based on patterns of speciation in other endemic montane bird species of the same region, it may potentially have to be split into two distinct species; if so, the name Otus brookii would be restricted to just the Bornean population.

== Taxonomy ==
There are two subspecies known from two different islands: O. b. brookii (the type subspecies) found on Borneo and O. b. solokensis found on Sumatra. Taking into account speciation patterns within Otus and general phylogeographic patterns of montane birds on Borneo and Sumatra, both subspecies likely represent two distinct species; taxonomic studies will be required to confirm or deny this claim.

== Distribution ==
O. b. solokensis has a comparatively large range, being distributed throughout the length of the Barisan Mountains. In contrast, O. b. brookii was formerly only known to have a comparatively small range in the mountains straddling the border of Kalimantan and Sarawak, with a small extension into Sabah. Due to its secretive nature, it had not been sighted since its description by Richard Bowdler Sharpe in 1892. In May 2016, an individual was observed and photographed on the slopes of Mount Kinabalu, well away from the range it was formerly assumed to have, marking a new range extension for the subspecies. This was the first sighting of it in over 125 years, and the first-ever photograph of it in the wild. Sightings were again reported in 2021.

== Description ==
Adults have a fierce-looking face. The body overall is dark brown. When perched, the blackish crown and white ear-tufts are visible. Its underparts are brownish with thick black streaking. It has a distinct orange iris. The subspecies Otus brookii solokensis is different in plumage from O. b. brookii in having darker underparts, thicker streaking a less distinct nuchal collar. Juveniles of O. b. brookii remain undescribed. O. b.solokensis has rufous upperparts and vermiculations on the underparts.

== Vocalizations ==
O.b.solokensis has an explosive "owh" or "owh-owh" barking call lasting about a half-second and repeated irregularly.

== Habitat ==
It is uncommon in montane forests above an altitude of 1,100 m (3,600 ft). It can be found perched in the lower canopy.
