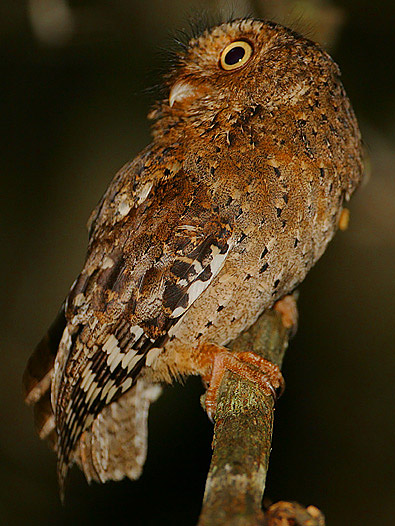

Conservation status
- Endangered (IUCN 3.1)
- CITES Appendix II

Scientific classification
- Kingdom: Animalia
- Phylum: Chordata
- Class: Aves
- Order: Strigiformes
- Family: Strigidae
- Genus: Otus
- Species: O. ireneae

Binomial name
- Otus ireneae Ripley, 1966

= Sokoke scops owl =

Species of owl

The Sokoke scops owl (Otus ireneae), also Morden's scops owl or Morden's owlet, is a highly localized species of scops owl found in lowland forests of Kenya and Tanzania. The greatest population of this species of owl is in the Cynometra-Manilkara forest, which is less than one-third of the Sokoke Forest. It is also found in the Afzelia-Cynometra forest.

The Sokoke scops owl can grow to 6 1/2 in (17 cm), and can weigh up to 2 oz (57 g), and is the smallest of the scops owls. It is insectivorous and coloring ranges from grey to rufous.

== Description ==
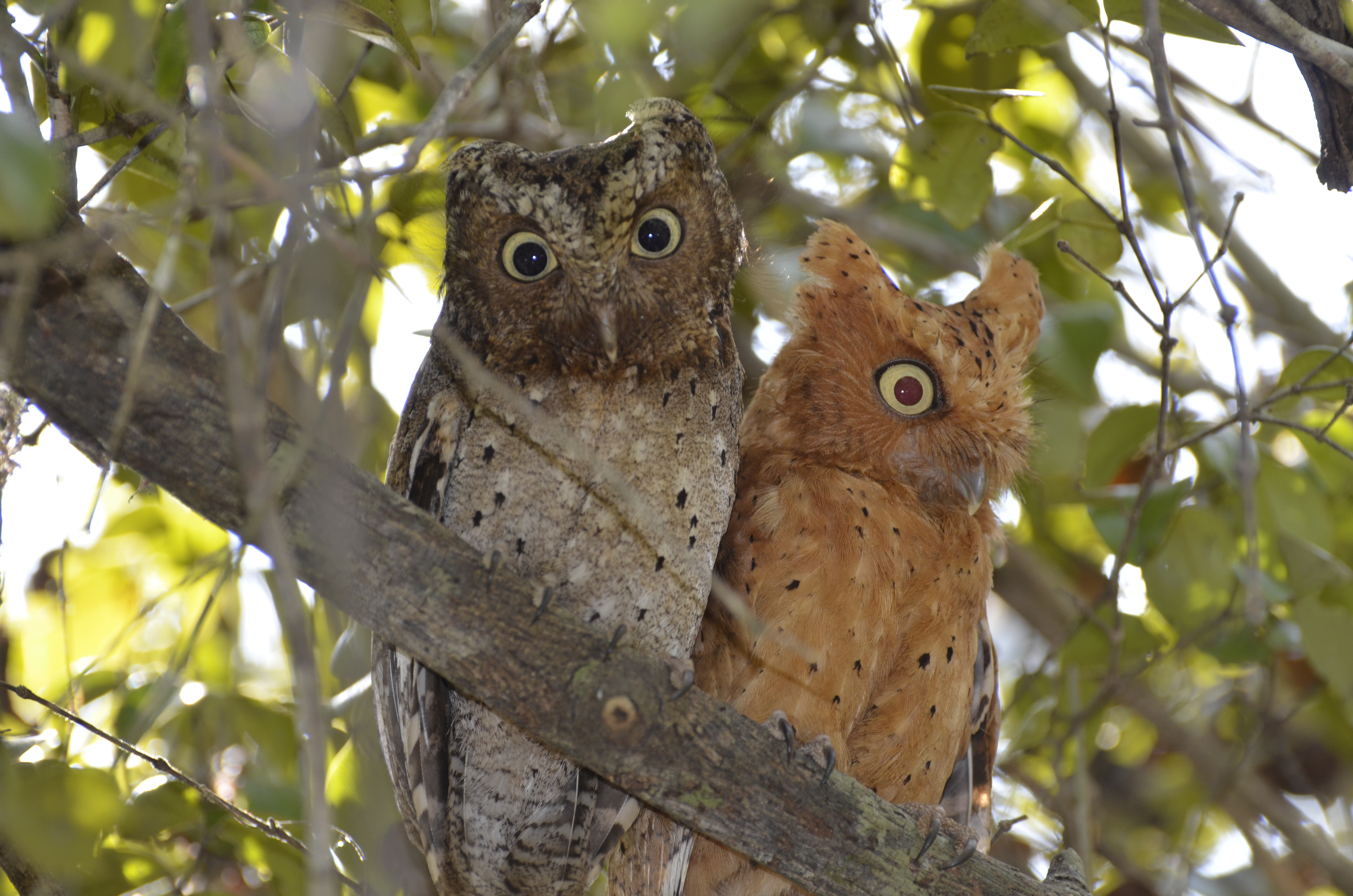
Sokoke scops owl pair in Arabuko-Sokoke Forest

Sokoke scops owl is a fairly plain scops owl with small spotted markings on the underside. They are found in a number of color morphs ranging from grey through brown to an orange-rufous. Their call consists of a repetitive "too-too-too-too-too" reminiscent of the calls of tinkerbirds. Males have a higher-pitched, louder and clearer call compared to females, which have a softer, muffled, low-pitched call. They are territorial and pairs may duet in response to intruding conspecifics. The calling intensity of spontaneously calling owls varies with the time of night and phase of the moon.

== Distribution ==
Sokoke scops owl have a highly restricted range in coastal Kenya and north-eastern Tanzania. It was first discovered in 1965 in the Arabuko-Sokoke Forest Reserve in coastal Kenya. Two other isolated populations have been subsequently discovered in the Dakatcha woodlands in Kenya and in the Manga and Kwamgumi forest reserves in the lowlands of the East Usambara mountains, Tanzania. Its global range is not thought to exceed 500 km^{2}. Other isolated populations of this species may still persist in unsurveyed patches of suitable habitat.

== Habitat ==
Sokoke scops owl has very specific habitat requirements of undisturbed lowland forest. In the Arabuko-Sokoke Forest Reserve, it only occurs in forest dominated by Brachylaena and Cynometra, despite the presence of other forest types. It is thought that holes in Brachylaena trees provide suitable nesting sites for the owls and their removal may be responsible for population declines.

== Conservation ==
The IUCN places the Sokoke scops owl as globally Endangered on its Red List. Its dependence on undisturbed forest means that it is threatened by human disturbance such as logging, fires and encroachment. Suitable climatic conditions are predicted to shift southwards as the climate changes and be completely lost in the Usambaras by 2080. The isolation of suitable forest patches that are surrounded by human-modified habitats means that they risk extinction. Increasing populations of African elephants in the Arabuko-Sokoke Forest Reserve may also affect their populations through habitat degradation. Habitat restoration and translocation to other suitable habitat patches have been suggested as potential conservation interventions that may help prevent their extinction. Call surveys conducted in 2005 and 2008 in the Arabuko-Sokoke Forest Reserve place the population size of the reserve at 800 pairs. Densities in 1997 in the East Usambaras ranged from less than 1.5 pairs/km^{2} to 3 or 4 pairs/km^{2}, and the population is estimated to be markedly smaller than the Arabuko-Sokoke population.

== Behaviour ==
Like other Otus owls, they are strictly nocturnal, making their biology difficult to study. They are most active immediately after dark and before dawn and travel further from their roost sites to forage when there is less illumination from the Moon. They roost in the dense understory of Cynometra trees during the day. The mean home-range of a pair is 11 ha and there is very little overlap with neighboring pairs.

== Diet ==
Pellet samples show that they feed almost exclusively on medium-sized insects across a wide range of orders, with the predominant prey type likely dependent on availability at the time. Beetles (Coleoptera) and crickets (Orthoptera) appear to be consumed the most.
