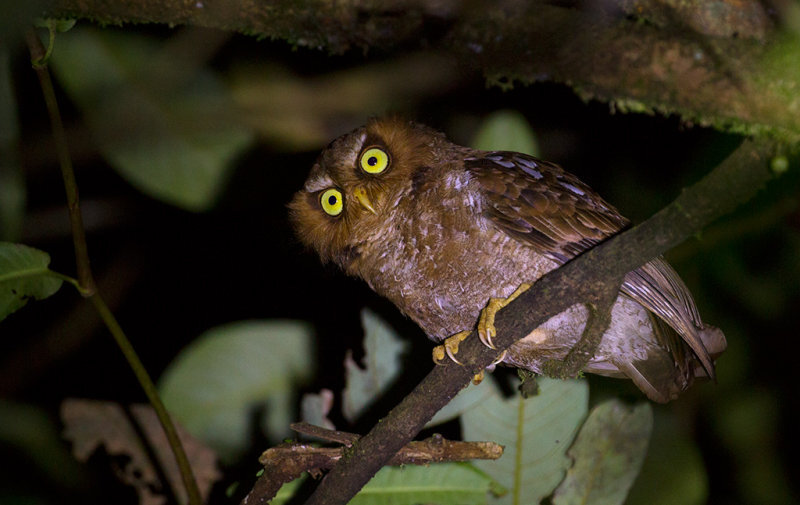

Conservation status
- Vulnerable (IUCN 3.1)
- CITES Appendix II

Scientific classification
- Kingdom: Animalia
- Phylum: Chordata
- Class: Aves
- Order: Strigiformes
- Family: Strigidae
- Genus: Otus
- Species: O. alfredi

Binomial name
- Otus alfredi (Hartert, 1897)

= Flores scops owl =

Species of owl

The Flores scops owl (Otus alfredi) is an owl endemic to the island of Flores, Indonesia. It is threatened by habitat loss. This owl is around 19–21 cm from head to tail. They are a forest dwelling owl that is smallish in size. Some 2,500–9,999 individuals are estimated to be extant in the wild, dwindling due to habitat loss.

== Taxonomy ==
The Flores scops owl has a generic name of Otus which was first introduced by Thomas Pennant, a Welsh naturalist and traveller, in 1769. "Otus" is derived from the Greek word "otos," which means eared owl.

== Description ==
The Flores scops owl is a small and compact owl. The species has short, rounded, and broad ear-tufts and a white vermiculation on the forehead. It has an orange-yellow beak, located above which are long and reddish rictal bristles, similar to mammalian whiskers. It possesses a red-brown facial outline, dark rufous feathers along the side of the neck with white bases, small white triangles on its hind-neck and white scapular spots with brown tips. It has a tiny tail that is barely visible, dense feathers on the legs, and dark orange-yellow claws.

== Observations ==
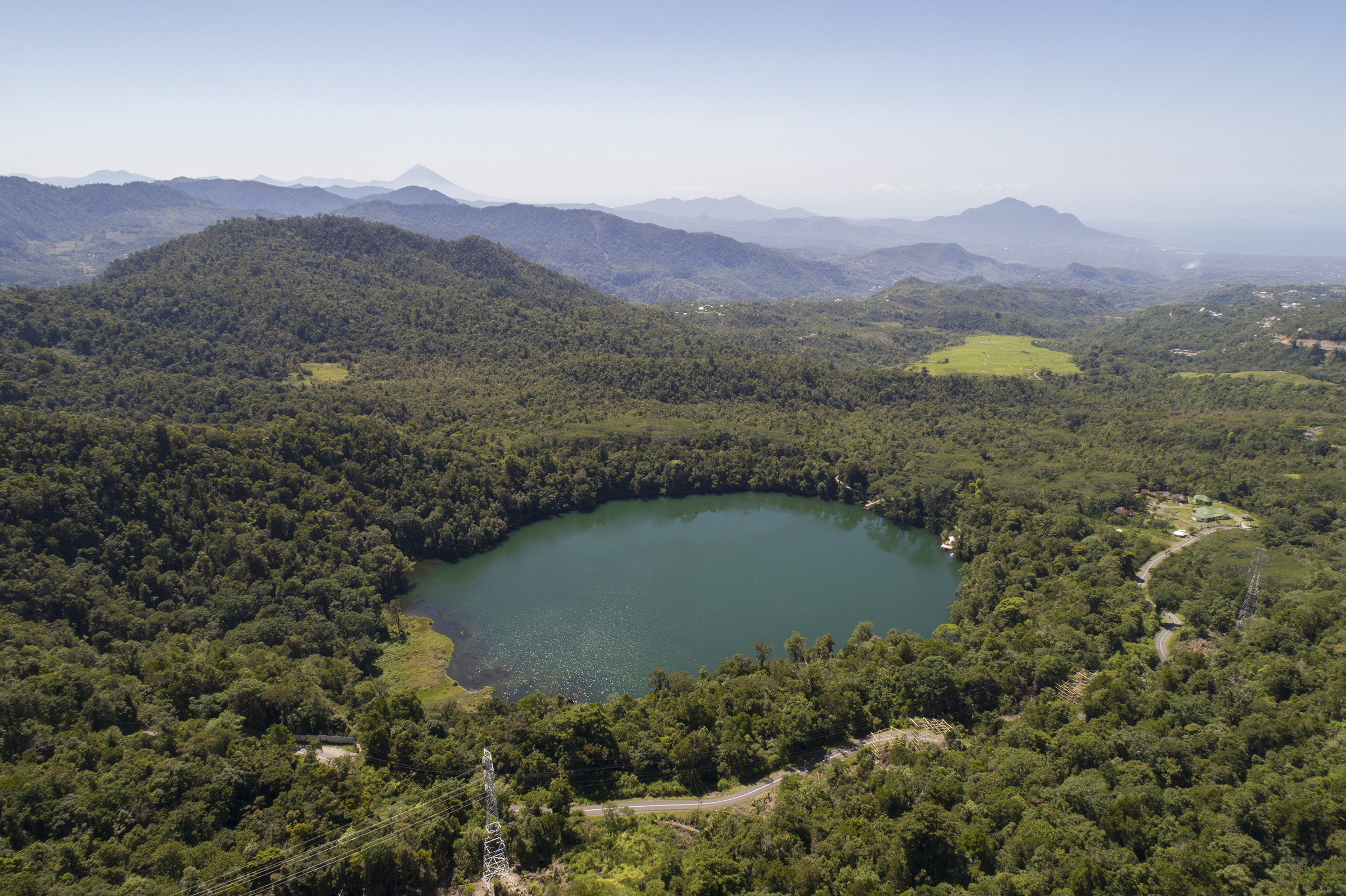
Danau Ranamese in Flores, the site of an observation in 2005

Prior to more recent observations, there were only six records of sightings of the Flores scops owl by Alfred Everett in 1896. These sightings of the three Flores scops owls were discovered in the Todo Mountains in southwest Flores, and the birds were captured to be held in captivity. More recent observations were made by Robert Hutchinson, James Eaton, and Bram Demeulemeester on June 20, 2005, at Danau Ranamese. Four owls were sighted in the tall secluded trees of Flores.

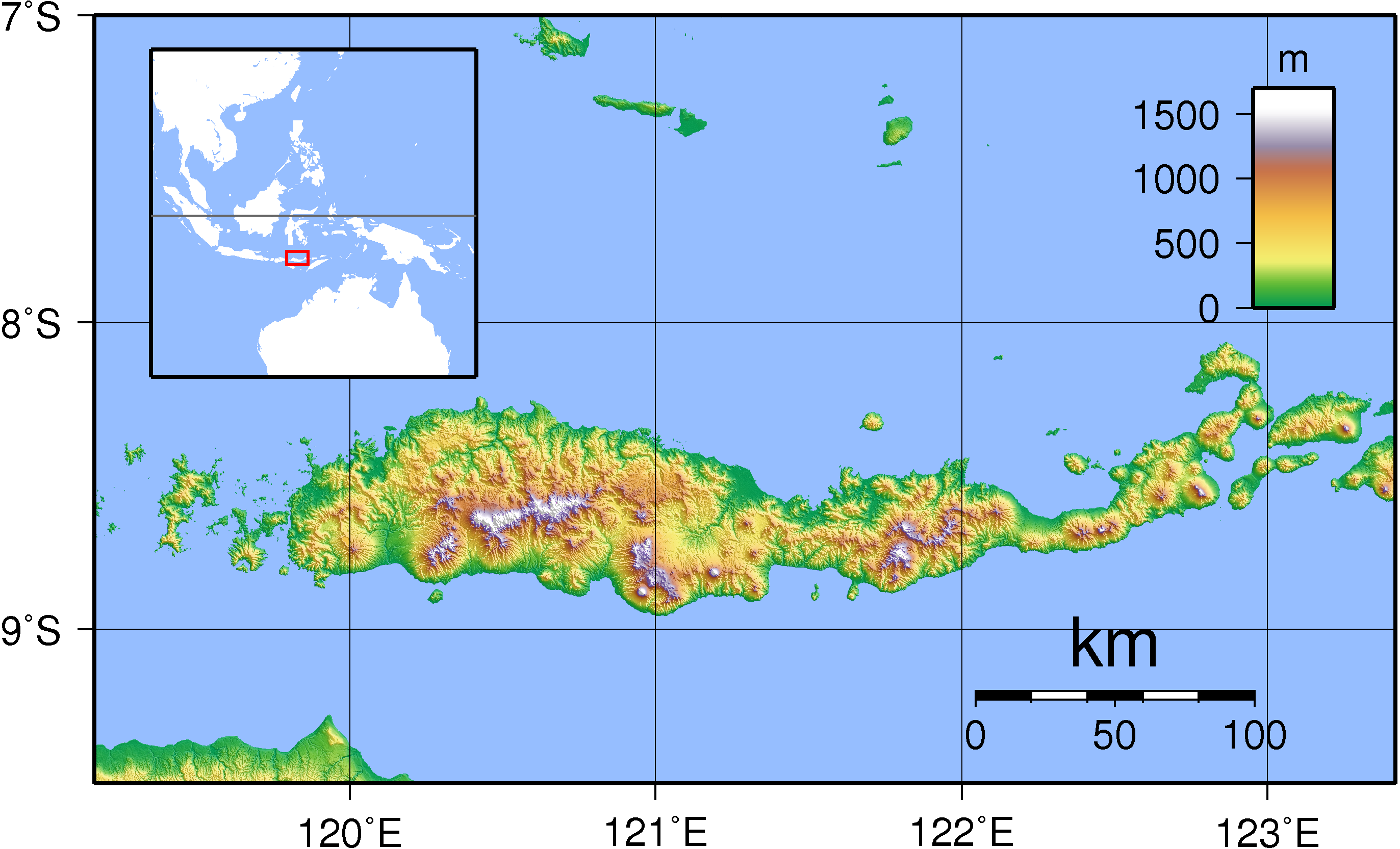
Topographic map of Flores

Another observation of these owls was made on September 4, 2005: one near Danau Ranamese and another near Poco Mandasawu.

More recent observations followed in 2011 by Andrew Hart Reeve and Samuel Rabenak at the edge of the Sisok forest, near the south-east shore of Danau Sano Nggoang. Callings of these owls were heard on September 1, 2011, and they were seen on the perch of bamboo.

=== Vocalisations ===
Single calls made by the Flores scops owl are quick and sharp notes, which are translated as "UH!" sounds and last 1.5-2.5 seconds with a frequency of 0.6-0.9kHz.

Territorial calls are more prevalent among the Flores scops owls. They are described as a distinctive "short burst of loud, rapid staccato notes" and are translated as "UH-UH-UH-UH..." with frequencies similar to single calls. Each call lasts from 1.5 to 3.0 seconds and can go on for as long as fifteen minutes. These calls are delivered by the owls in pairs where the calls seem identical; however, it was typical for one out of the two owls to deliver an alternative form of this call which is typically quieter as well as softer than the original territorial call.

== Habitat and distribution ==
The Flores scops owl is endemic to the island of Flores, Indonesia, and inhabits montane forests from 1,000-1,400m. It was thought that these owls thrive in moist semi-evergreen forests of the Flores highlands. However, the recent observations in the Sisok forest imply their habitat can vary between these moist forests as well as the dry monsoon forests that exist at lower altitudes.

== Status ==
According to the IUCN Red List, the Flores scops owl is listed as a vulnerable species. The population, as of 2025, is currently declining with 2,500–9,999 mature individuals extant in the wild.

=== Threats ===
Threats include annual and perennial non-timber crops, logging and wood harvesting, habitat shifting, roads and railroads, fire, and fire suppression.

=== Conservation ===
Conservation actions are currently underway at the Ruteng Nature Recreation Park in order to protect important remnants of the montane forests in which the Flores scops owls thrive.

Other conservation actions have been proposed such as extensive nocturnal surveys to take place in the mountains of Ruteng as well as the ridge forests of Mata Wae Ndeo.
