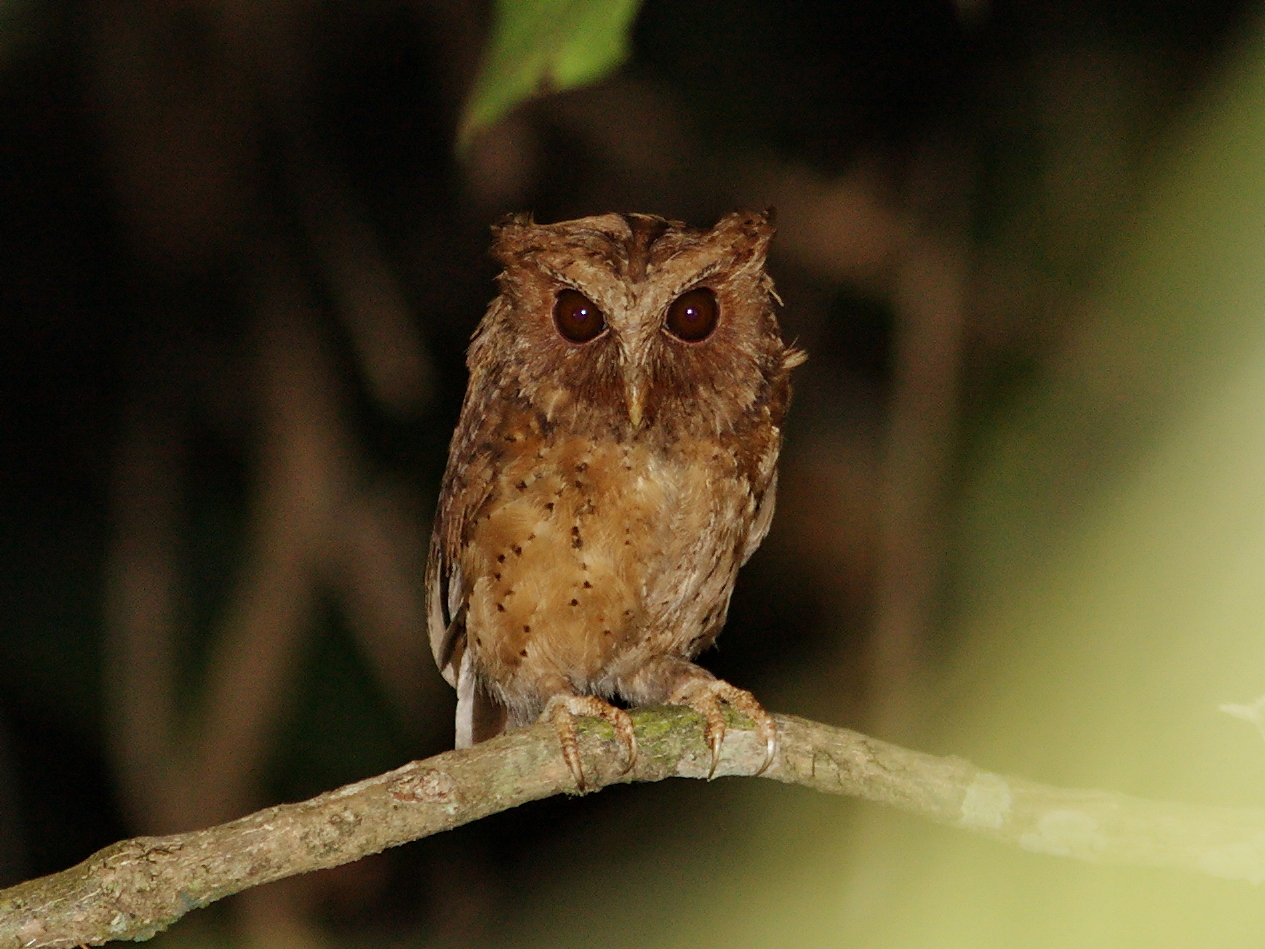

Conservation status
- Near Threatened (IUCN 3.1)
- CITES Appendix II

Scientific classification
- Kingdom: Animalia
- Phylum: Chordata
- Class: Aves
- Order: Strigiformes
- Family: Strigidae
- Genus: Otus
- Species: O. rufescens

Binomial name
- Otus rufescens (Horsfield, 1821)

= Reddish scops owl =

Species of owl

The reddish scops owl (Otus rufescens) is an owl found in southeast Asia, in the countries of Thailand, Malaysia, Indonesia, and Brunei.

== Description ==
The reddish scops owl measures 15-18 cm in length and has a body mass of 70-83 g. Body is generally a red-brown, with paler face and ear tufts. Displays black spotting across chest, and white spotting along back and wings; juveniles appear similar to adult individuals, but with less spotting.

The call of the owl is a whistling “hooo," which is repeated in 7-11 second intervals. The calls of this species are able to be reliably sexed, with males having a higher pitched call than females.

== Taxonomy ==
The reddish scops owl was first described by Thomas Horsfield in 1821 under the binomial Strix rufescens.

The owl has two subspecies:

- O. r. malayensis
- O. r. rufescens

== Habitat ==
The reddish scops owl lives in lowland regions including rainforests and swamps. The owl does not migrate, and primarily inhabits a home range of 1.31–2.16 hectares.

== Conservation Status ==
The reddish scops owl is evaluated by the IUCN as near threatened, and its population is believed to be decreasing. The primary threat to these birds is habitat loss from logging; an estimated 14%-18% of the forests the owl inhabits have been lost in the last decade. This species is also threatened by capture and sale in illegal wildlife trade.

== Diet ==
While not extensively studied, the diet of the reddish scops owl consists of primarily arthropods and small vertebrates.

== Breeding ==
The reddish scops owl nests in tree cavities. On Java, eggs of the species have been found in March and April, with a nestling present by mid-July.
