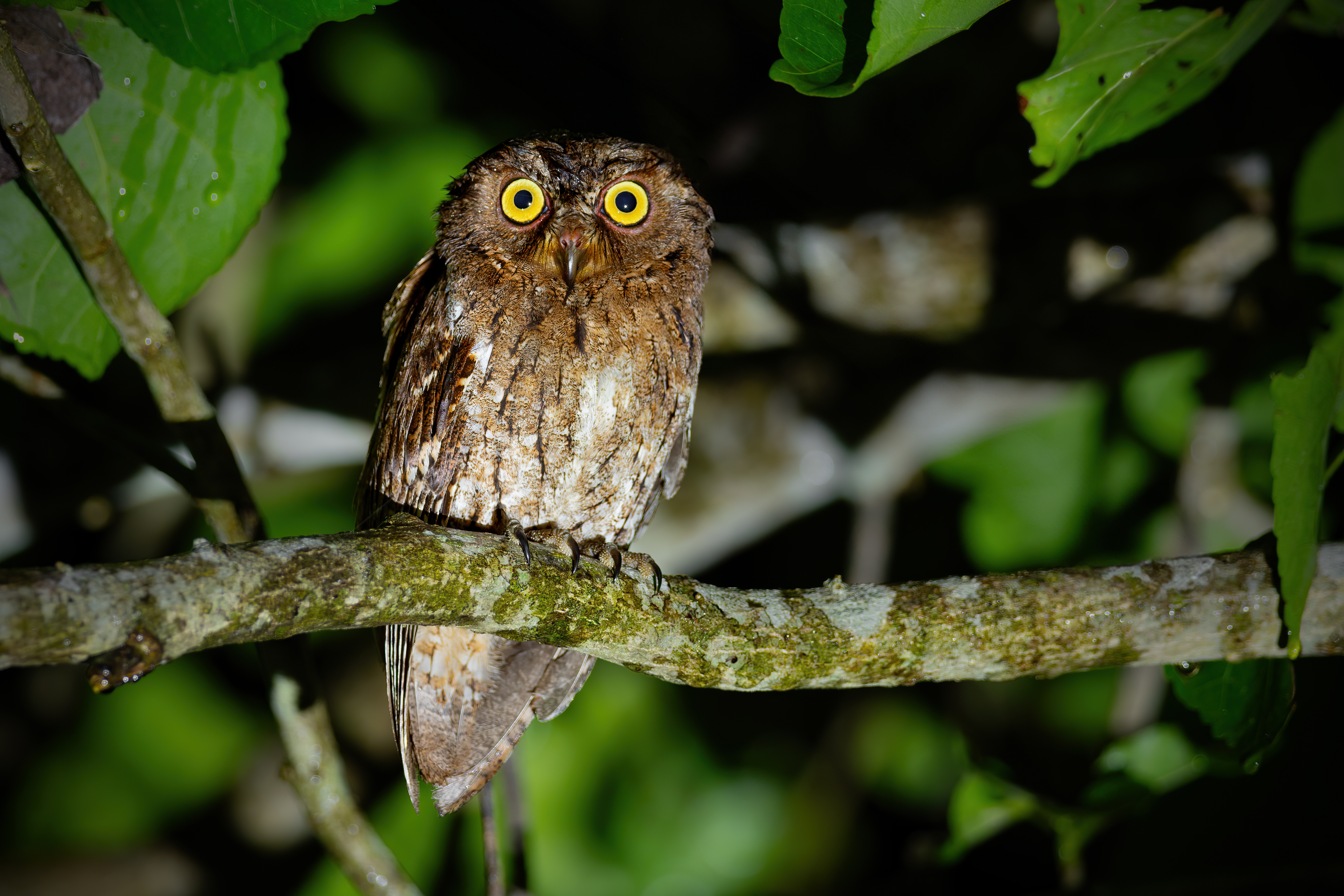

Conservation status
- Least Concern (IUCN 3.1)
- CITES Appendix II

Scientific classification
- Kingdom: Animalia
- Phylum: Chordata
- Class: Aves
- Order: Strigiformes
- Family: Strigidae
- Genus: Otus
- Species: O. manadensis

Binomial name
- Otus manadensis (Quoy & Gaimard, 1832)

Synonyms
- Scops menadensis

= Sulawesi scops owl =

Species of owl

The Sulawesi scops owl (Otus manadensis) is an owl found on the Sulawesi island of Indonesia.

The Banggai scops owl (Otus mendeni) was formerly considered conspecific, but was split as a distinct species by the IOC in 2021.

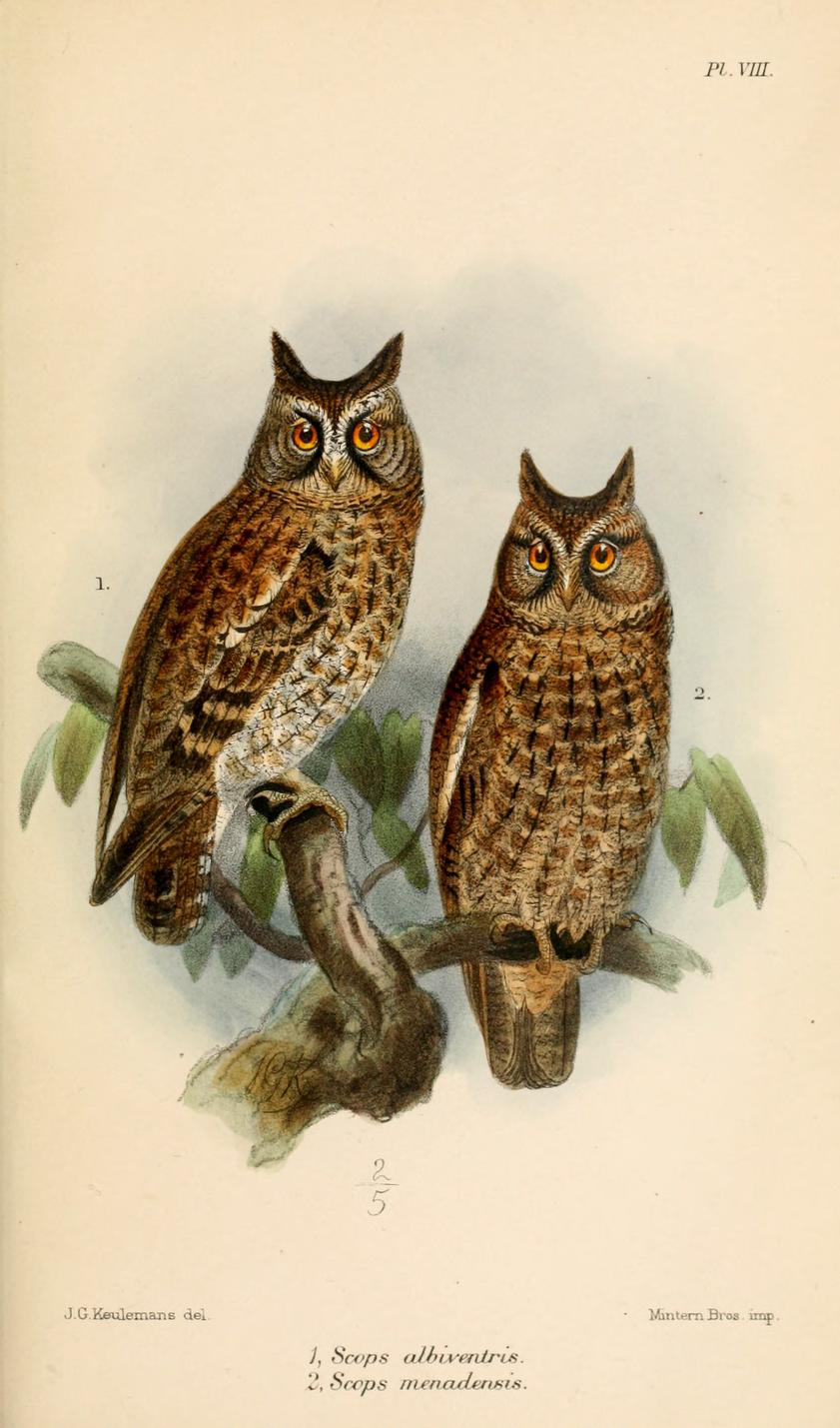
Otus manadensis (right), John Gerrard Keulemans
