= List of owl species =

The International Ornithological Committee (IOC) recognizes these 254 species of owl in order Strigiformes; they are distributed among 25 genera in two families. The 20 species of genera Tyto and Phodilus, the barn owls, are in family Tytonidae. The other 234 species are in family Strigidae, the "typical owls". Five species on the list are extinct; they are marked (X). For a partial list with additional information, see the article "List of Strigiformes by population".

This list is presented according to the IOC taxonomic sequence and can also be sorted alphabetically by common name and binomial.

Common name	Binomial name + authority	IOC sequence
Greater sooty owl	Tyto tenebricosa (Gould, 1845)	1
Lesser sooty owl	Tyto multipunctata Mathews, 1912	2
Minahasa masked owl	Tyto inexspectata (Schlegel, 1879)	3
Taliabu masked owl	Tyto nigrobrunnea Neumann, 1939	4
Moluccan masked owl	Tyto sororcula (Sclater, PL, 1883)	5
Manus masked owl	Tyto manusi Rothschild & Hartert, EJO, 1914	6
Golden masked owl	Tyto aurantia (Salvadori, 1881)	7
Australian masked owl	Tyto novaehollandiae (Stephens, 1826)	8
Sulawesi masked owl	Tyto rosenbergii (Schlegel, 1866)	9
Red owl	Tyto soumagnei (Grandidier, A, 1878)	10
Western barn owl	Tyto alba (Scopoli, 1769)	11
American barn owl	Tyto furcata (Temminck, 1827)	12
Eastern barn owl	Tyto javanica (Gmelin, JF, 1788)	13
Andaman masked owl	Tyto deroepstorffi (Hume, 1875)	14
Ashy-faced owl	Tyto glaucops (Kaup, 1852)	15
African grass owl	Tyto capensis (Smith, A, 1834)	16
Eastern grass owl	Tyto longimembris (Jerdon, 1839)	17
Itombwe owl	Tyto prigoginei (Schouteden, 1952)	18
Oriental bay owl	Phodilus badius (Horsfield, 1821)	19
Sri Lanka bay owl	Phodilus assimilis Hume, 1877	20
Papuan hawk-owl	Uroglaux dimorpha (Salvadori, 1874)	21
Laughing owl (X)	Ninox albifacies (Gray, GR, 1844)	22
Rufous owl	Ninox rufa (Gould, 1846)	23
Powerful owl	Ninox strenua (Gould, 1838)	24
Barking owl	Ninox connivens (Latham, 1801)	25
Sumba boobook	Ninox rudolfi Meyer, AB, 1882	26
Australian boobook	Ninox boobook (Latham, 1801)	27
Rote boobook	Ninox rotiensis Johnstone, RE & Darnell, 1997	28
Timor boobook	Ninox fusca (Vieillot, 1817)	29
Alor boobook	Ninox plesseni Stresemann, 1929	30
Tasmanian boobook	Ninox leucopsis (Gould, 1838)	31
Morepork	Ninox novaeseelandiae (Gmelin, JF, 1788)	32
Northern boobook	Ninox japonica (Temminck & Schlegel, 1845)	33
Brown boobook	Ninox scutulata (Raffles, 1822)	34
Hume's boobook	Ninox obscura Hume, 1872	35
Chocolate boobook	Ninox randi Deignan, 1951	36
Andaman boobook	Ninox affinis Beavan, 1867	37
Luzon boobook	Ninox philippensis Bonaparte, 1855	38
Mindanao boobook	Ninox spilocephala Tweeddale, 1879	39
Camiguin boobook	Ninox leventisi Rasmussen, Allen, D, Collar, Hutchinson, Jakosalem, Kennedy, RS, Lambert & Paguntalan, 2012	40
Sulu boobook	Ninox reyi Oustalet, 1880	41
Cebu boobook	Ninox rumseyi Rasmussen, Allen, D, Collar, Hutchinson, Jakosalem, Kennedy, RS, Lambert & Paguntalan, 2012	42
Romblon boobook	Ninox spilonotus Bourns & Worcester, 1894	43
Mindoro boobook	Ninox mindorensis Ogilvie-Grant, 1896	44
Least boobook	Ninox sumbaensis Olsen, Wink, Sauer-Gürth & Trost, 2002	45
Togian boobook	Ninox burhani Indrawan & Somadikarta, 2004	46
Ochre-bellied boobook	Ninox ochracea (Schlegel, 1866)	47
Cinnabar boobook	Ninox ios Rasmussen, 1999	48
Halmahera boobook	Ninox hypogramma (Gray, GR, 1861)	49
Buru boobook	Ninox hantu (Wallace, 1863)	50
Seram boobook	Ninox squamipila (Bonaparte, 1850)	51
Tanimbar boobook	Ninox forbesi Sclater, PL, 1883	52
Christmas boobook	Ninox natalis Lister, 1889	53
Manus boobook	Ninox meeki Rothschild & Hartert, EJO, 1914	54
Papuan boobook	Ninox theomacha (Bonaparte, 1855)	55
Speckled boobook	Ninox punctulata (Quoy & Gaimard, 1832)	56
New Britain boobook	Ninox odiosa Sclater, PL, 1877	57
New Ireland boobook	Ninox variegata (Quoy & Gaimard, 1832)	58
Bare-legged owl	Margarobyas lawrencii (Sclater, PL & Salvin, 1868)	59
Collared owlet	Taenioptynx brodiei (Burton, E, 1836)	60
Sunda owlet	Taenioptynx sylvaticus (Bonaparte, 1850)	61
Elf owl	Micrathene whitneyi (Cooper, JG, 1861)	62
Long-whiskered owlet	Xenoglaux loweryi O'Neill & Graves, GR, 1977	63
Boreal owl	Aegolius funereus (Linnaeus, 1758)	64
Northern saw-whet owl	Aegolius acadicus (Gmelin, JF, 1788)	65
Bermuda saw-whet owl (X)	Aegolius gradyi Olson, 2012	66
Unspotted saw-whet owl	Aegolius ridgwayi (Alfaro, 1905)	67
Buff-fronted owl	Aegolius harrisii (Cassin, 1849)	68
Forest owlet	Athene blewitti (Hume, 1873)	69
White-browed owl	Athene superciliaris (Vieillot, 1817)	70
Burrowing owl	Athene cunicularia (Molina, 1782)	71
Little owl	Athene noctua (Scopoli, 1769)	72
Spotted owlet	Athene brama (Temminck, 1821)	73
West Solomons owl	Athene jacquinoti Bonaparte, 1850	74
Guadalcanal owl	Athene granti (Sharpe, 1888)	75
Malaita owl	Athene malaitae (Mayr, 1931)	76
Makira owl	Athene roseoaxillaris (Hartert, EJO, 1929)	77
Northern hawk-owl	Surnia ulula (Linnaeus, 1758)	78
Eurasian pygmy owl	Glaucidium passerinum (Linnaeus, 1758)	79
Pearl-spotted owlet	Glaucidium perlatum (Vieillot, 1817)	80
Red-chested owlet	Glaucidium tephronotum Sharpe, 1875	81
Sjöstedt's barred owlet	Glaucidium sjostedti Reichenow, 1893	82
Asian barred owlet	Glaucidium cuculoides (Vigors, 1830)	83
Javan owlet	Glaucidium castanopterum (Horsfield, 1821)	84
Jungle owlet	Glaucidium radiatum (Tickell, 1833)	85
Chestnut-backed owlet	Glaucidium castanotum (Blyth, 1851)	86
African barred owlet	Glaucidium capense (Smith, A, 1834)	87
Albertine owlet	Glaucidium albertinum Prigogine, 1983	88
Northern pygmy owl	Glaucidium californicum Sclater, PL, 1857	89
Mountain pygmy owl	Glaucidium gnoma Wagler, 1832	90
Baja pygmy owl	Glaucidium hoskinsii Brewster, 1888	91
Guatemalan pygmy owl	Glaucidium cobanense Sharpe, 1875	92
Costa Rican pygmy owl	Glaucidium costaricanum Kelso, L, 1937	93
Cloud-forest pygmy owl	Glaucidium nubicola Robbins & Stiles, 1999	94
Andean pygmy owl	Glaucidium jardinii (Bonaparte, 1855)	95
Yungas pygmy owl	Glaucidium bolivianum König, C, 1991	96
Colima pygmy owl	Glaucidium palmarum Nelson, 1901	97
Tamaulipas pygmy owl	Glaucidium sanchezi Lowery & Newman, RJ, 1949	98
Central American pygmy owl	Glaucidium griseiceps Sharpe, 1875	99
Subtropical pygmy owl	Glaucidium parkeri Robbins & Howell, SNG, 1995	100
Amazonian pygmy owl	Glaucidium hardyi Vielliard, 1989	101
East Brazilian pygmy owl	Glaucidium minutissimum (Wied-Neuwied, M, 1830)	102
Pernambuco pygmy owl	Glaucidium mooreorum Cardoso da Silva, Coelho & Gonzaga, 2003	103
Ferruginous pygmy owl	Glaucidium brasilianum (Gmelin, JF, 1788)	104
Pacific pygmy owl	Glaucidium peruanum König, C, 1991	105
Austral pygmy owl	Glaucidium nana (King, PP, 1827)	106
Cuban pygmy owl	Glaucidium siju (d'Orbigny, 1839)	107
Giant scops owl	Otus gurneyi (Tweeddale, 1879)	108
White-fronted scops owl	Otus sagittatus (Cassin, 1849)	109
Reddish scops owl	Otus rufescens (Horsfield, 1821)	110
Serendib scops owl	Otus thilohoffmanni Warakagoda & Rasmussen, 2004	111
Sandy scops owl	Otus icterorhynchus (Shelley, 1873)	112
Sokoke scops owl	Otus ireneae Ripley, 1966	113
Andaman scops owl	Otus balli (Hume, 1873)	114
Flores scops owl	Otus alfredi (Hartert, EJO, 1897)	115
Mountain scops owl	Otus spilocephalus (Blyth, 1846)	116
Javan scops owl	Otus angelinae (Finsch, 1912)	117
Mindanao scops owl	Otus mirus Ripley & Rabor, 1968	118
Luzon scops owl	Otus longicornis (Ogilvie-Grant, 1894)	119
Mindoro scops owl	Otus mindorensis (Whitehead, J, 1899)	120
Torotoroka scops owl	Otus madagascariensis (Grandidier, A, 1867)	121
Rainforest scops owl	Otus rutilus (Pucheran, 1849)	122
Mayotte scops owl	Otus mayottensis Benson, 1960	123
Karthala scops owl	Otus pauliani Benson, 1960	124
Anjouan scops owl	Otus capnodes (Gurney, JH Sr, 1889)	125
Moheli scops owl	Otus moheliensis Lafontaine & Moulaert, 1998	126
Reunion scops owl (X)	Otus grucheti (Mourer-Chauviré, Bour, Moutou & Ribes, 1994)	127
Mauritius scops owl (X)	Otus sauzieri (Newton, E & Gadow, 1893)	128
Rodrigues scops owl (X)	Otus murivorus (Milne-Edwards, 1873)	129
Pallid scops owl	Otus brucei (Hume, 1872)	130
Arabian scops owl	Otus pamelae Bates, GL, 1937	131
Eurasian scops owl	Otus scops (Linnaeus, 1758)	132
Cyprus scops owl	Otus cyprius (Madarász, G, 1901)	133
Principe scops owl	Otus bikegila Melo, Freitas, Verbelen, da Costa, Pereira, Fuchs, Sangster, Correia, de Lima & Crottini, 2022	134
Pemba scops owl	Otus pembaensis Pakenham, 1937	135
Sao Tome scops owl	Otus hartlaubi (Giebel, 1872)	136
African scops owl	Otus senegalensis (Swainson, 1837)	137
Annobon scops owl	Otus feae (Salvadori, 1903)	138
Socotra scops owl	Otus socotranus (Ogilvie-Grant & Forbes, HO, 1899)	139
Oriental scops owl	Otus sunia (Hodgson, 1836)	140
Ryukyu scops owl	Otus elegans (Cassin, 1852)	141
Moluccan scops owl	Otus magicus (Müller, S, 1841)	142
Wetar scops owl	Otus tempestatis (Hartert, EJO, 1904)	143
Sula scops owl	Otus sulaensis (Hartert, EJO, 1898)	144
Biak scops owl	Otus beccarii (Salvadori, 1876)	145
Sulawesi scops owl	Otus manadensis (Quoy & Gaimard, 1832)	146
Banggai scops owl	Otus mendeni Neumann, 1939	147
Siau scops owl	Otus siaoensis (Schlegel, 1873)	148
Sangihe scops owl	Otus collari Lambert & Rasmussen, 1998	149
Mantanani scops owl	Otus mantananensis (Sharpe, 1892)	150
Seychelles scops owl	Otus insularis (Tristram, 1880)	151
Nicobar scops owl	Otus alius Rasmussen, 1998	152
Simeulue scops owl	Otus umbra (Richmond, 1903)	153
Enggano scops owl	Otus enganensis Riley, 1927	154
Mentawai scops owl	Otus mentawi Chasen & Kloss, 1926	155
Rajah scops owl	Otus brookii (Sharpe, 1892)	156
Indian scops owl	Otus bakkamoena Pennant, 1769	157
Collared scops owl	Otus lettia (Hodgson, 1836)	158
Japanese scops owl	Otus semitorques Temminck & Schlegel, 1845	159
Sunda scops owl	Otus lempiji (Horsfield, 1821)	160
Philippine scops owl	Otus megalotis (Walden, 1875)	161
Negros scops owl	Otus nigrorum Rand, 1950	162
Everett's scops owl	Otus everetti (Tweeddale, 1879)	163
Palawan scops owl	Otus fuliginosus (Sharpe, 1888)	164
Wallace's scops owl	Otus silvicola (Wallace, 1864)	165
Rinjani scops owl	Otus jolandae Sangster, King, BF, Verbelen & Trainor, 2013	166
Palau scops owl	Otus podarginus (Hartlaub & Finsch, 1872)	167
Northern white-faced owl	Ptilopsis leucotis (Temminck, 1820)	168
Southern white-faced owl	Ptilopsis granti (Kollibay, 1910)	169
Jamaican owl	Asio grammicus (Gosse, 1847)	170
Striped owl	Asio clamator (Vieillot, 1808)	171
Long-eared owl	Asio otus (Linnaeus, 1758)	172
Abyssinian owl	Asio abyssinicus (Guérin-Méneville, 1843)	173
Madagascar owl	Asio madagascariensis (Smith, A, 1834)	174
Stygian owl	Asio stygius (Wagler, 1832)	175
Short-eared owl	Asio flammeus (Pontoppidan, 1763)	176
Marsh owl	Asio capensis (Smith, A, 1834)	177
Fearful owl	Asio solomonensis (Hartert, EJO, 1901)	178
Maned owl	Jubula lettii (Büttikofer, 1889)	179
Snowy owl	Bubo scandiacus (Linnaeus, 1758)	180
Great horned owl	Bubo virginianus (Gmelin, JF, 1788)	181
Lesser horned owl	Bubo magellanicus (Lesson, RP, 1828)	182
Eurasian eagle-owl	Bubo bubo (Linnaeus, 1758)	183
Indian eagle-owl	Bubo bengalensis (Franklin, 1831)	184
Pharaoh eagle-owl	Bubo ascalaphus Savigny, 1809	185
Cape eagle-owl	Bubo capensis Smith, A, 1834	186
Arabian eagle-owl	Bubo milesi Sharpe, 1886	187
Greyish eagle-owl	Bubo cinerascens Guérin-Méneville, 1843	188
Spotted eagle-owl	Bubo africanus (Temminck, 1821)	189
Fraser's eagle-owl	Ketupa poensis (Fraser, 1854)	190
Akun eagle-owl	Ketupa leucosticta (Hartlaub, 1855)	191
Verreaux's eagle-owl	Ketupa lactea (Temminck, 1820)	192
Shelley's eagle-owl	Ketupa shelleyi (Sharpe & Ussher, 1872)	193
Blakiston's fish owl	Ketupa blakistoni (Seebohm, 1884)	194
Brown fish owl	Ketupa zeylonensis (Gmelin, JF, 1788)	195
Tawny fish owl	Ketupa flavipes (Hodgson, 1836)	196
Buffy fish owl	Ketupa ketupu (Horsfield, 1821)	197
Barred eagle-owl	Ketupa sumatrana (Raffles, 1822)	198
Spot-bellied eagle-owl	Ketupa nipalensis (Hodgson, 1836)	199
Dusky eagle-owl	Ketupa coromanda (Latham, 1790)	200
Philippine eagle-owl	Ketupa philippensis (Kaup, 1851)	201
Pel's fishing owl	Scotopelia peli Bonaparte, 1850	202
Rufous fishing owl	Scotopelia ussheri Sharpe, 1871	203
Vermiculated fishing owl	Scotopelia bouvieri Sharpe, 1875	204
Flammulated owl	Psiloscops flammeolus (Kaup, 1852)	205
Puerto Rican owl	Gymnasio nudipes (Daudin, 1800)	206
Whiskered screech owl	Megascops trichopsis (Wagler, 1832)	207
Bare-shanked screech owl	Megascops clarkii (Kelso, L & Kelso, EH, 1935)	208
White-throated screech owl	Megascops albogularis (Cassin, 1849)	209
Tropical screech owl	Megascops choliba (Vieillot, 1817)	210
Bearded screech owl	Megascops barbarus (Sclater, PL & Salvin, 1868)	211
Pacific screech owl	Megascops cooperi (Ridgway, 1878)	212
Western screech owl	Megascops kennicottii (Elliot, DG, 1867)	213
Eastern screech owl	Megascops asio (Linnaeus, 1758)	214
Balsas screech owl	Megascops seductus (Moore, RT, 1941)	215
Middle American screech owl	Megascops guatemalae (Sharpe, 1875)	216
Koepcke's screech owl	Megascops koepckeae (Hekstra, 1982)	217
Rufescent screech owl	Megascops ingens (Salvin, 1897)	218
Cinnamon screech owl	Megascops petersoni (Fitzpatrick & O'Neill, 1986)	219
Cloud-forest screech owl	Megascops marshalli (Weske & Terborgh, 1981)	220
Yungas screech owl	Megascops hoyi (König, C & Straneck, 1989)	221
Choco screech owl	Megascops centralis (Hekstra, 1982)	222
Foothill screech owl	Megascops roraimae (Salvin, 1897)	223
Long-tufted screech owl	Megascops sanctaecatarinae (Salvin, 1897)	224
Santa Marta screech owl	Megascops gilesi Krabbe, 2017	225
West Peruvian screech owl	Megascops roboratus (Bangs & Noble, 1918)	226
Tawny-bellied screech owl	Megascops watsonii (Cassin, 1849)	227
Black-capped screech owl	Megascops atricapilla (Temminck, 1822)	228
Spectacled owl	Pulsatrix perspicillata (Latham, 1790)	229
Tawny-browed owl	Pulsatrix koeniswaldiana (Bertoni, MS & Bertoni, AW, 1901)	230
Band-bellied owl	Pulsatrix melanota (Tschudi, 1844)	231
Crested owl	Lophostrix cristata (Daudin, 1800)	232
Spotted wood owl	Strix seloputo Horsfield, 1821	233
Mottled wood owl	Strix ocellata (Lesson, RP, 1839)	234
Brown wood owl	Strix leptogrammica Temminck, 1832	235
Tawny owl	Strix aluco Linnaeus, 1758	236
Maghreb owl	Strix mauritanica (Witherby, 1905)	237
Himalayan owl	Strix nivicolum (Blyth, 1845)	238
Desert owl	Strix hadorami Kirwan, Schweizer & Copete, 2015	239
Omani owl	Strix butleri (Hume, 1878)	240
Spotted owl	Strix occidentalis (Xántus, J, 1860)	241
Barred owl	Strix varia Barton, 1799	242
Cinereous owl	Strix sartorii (Ridgway, 1874)	243
Fulvous owl	Strix fulvescens (Sclater, PL & Salvin, 1868)	244
Rusty-barred owl	Strix hylophila Temminck, 1825	245
Chaco owl	Strix chacoensis Cherrie & Reichenberger, 1921	246
Rufous-legged owl	Strix rufipes King, PP, 1827	247
Ural owl	Strix uralensis Pallas, 1771	248
Great grey owl	Strix nebulosa Forster, JR, 1772	249
African wood owl	Strix woodfordii (Smith, A, 1834)	250
Mottled owl	Strix virgata (Cassin, 1849)	251
Black-and-white owl	Strix nigrolineata (Sclater, PL, 1859)	252
Black-banded owl	Strix huhula Daudin, 1800	253
Rufous-banded owl	Strix albitarsis (Bonaparte, 1850)	254
