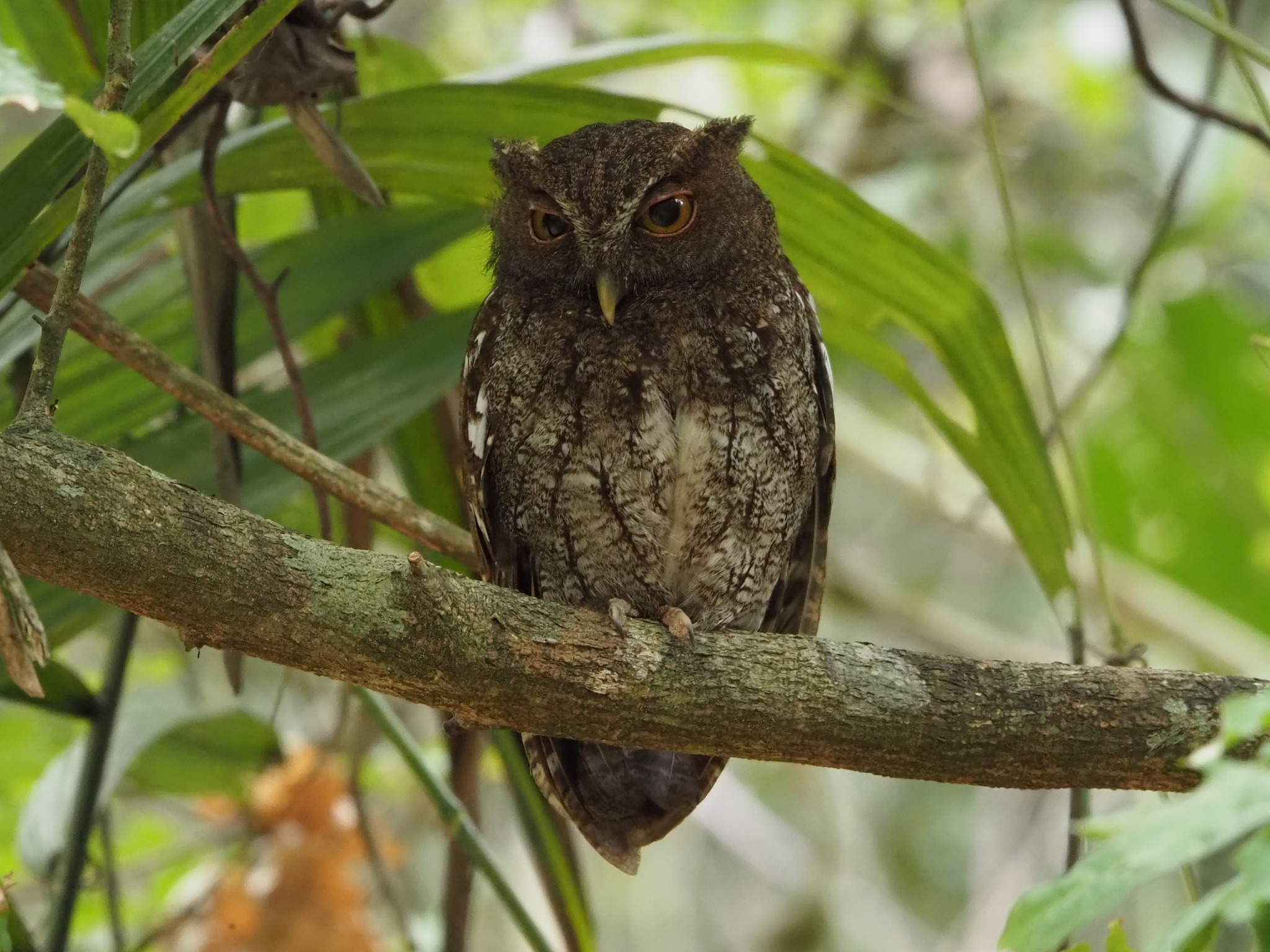

Conservation status
- CITES Appendix II (CITES)

Scientific classification
- Kingdom: Animalia
- Phylum: Chordata
- Class: Aves
- Order: Strigiformes
- Family: Strigidae
- Genus: Megascops
- Species: M. centralis

Binomial name
- Megascops centralis (Hekstra, 1982)

Synonyms
- Otus centralis Megascops guatemalae centralis

= Chocó screech owl =

Species of owl

The Chocó screech owl (Megascops centralis) is a species of owl in the family Strigidae. It is found from central Panama to western Ecuador.

== Taxonomy and systematics ==
The Chocó screech owl's taxonomy has undergone numerous changes. It has variously been treated as embedded in or a subspecies of the original Otus guatemalae and then as a subspecies of O. vermiculatus when that was split from O. guatemalae. In the early 2000s, all of the New World members of Otus were assigned to Megascops. As of 2019, the International Ornithological Committee (IOC), the North and South American Classification Committees of the American Ornithological Society (AOS), and the Clements taxonomy treat it as a separate species, Megascops centralis. However, BirdLife International's Handbook of the Birds of the World treats it as being embedded within M. vermiculatus vermiculatus, the nominate subspecies of vermiculated screech owl.

The Chocó screech owl is monotypic.

== Description ==
The Chocó screech owl is 20.5 to 27 cm (8.1 to 10.6 in) long; two specimens weighed 106.7 and 121.5 g (3.76 and 4.29 oz). It has gray and rufous color morphs and many individuals' plumages are intermediate between the extremes. The gray morph has a grayish white facial disc with blackish bars and a faint black edge, indistinct whitish brows above yellow to red-orange eyes, and short but distinct "ear" tufts. The upperparts are brownish gray mottled with black and buff. The folded wing shows irregular white spots along the margin. Its chin is white and the rest of the underparts white to buffy white with narrow black bars and buffy to gray mottling. The rufous morph is rufous brown above with much less mottling than the gray morph and the undersides are shades of brown.

== Distribution and habitat ==
The Chocó screech owl is found from central Panama into northwestern Colombia and in a narrow band of western Ecuador. It inhabits the interior and borders of humid primary and secondary forest in lowlands and foothills. In elevation it ranges as high as 1,575 m (5,167 ft) in southwestern Ecuador but is usually found below 1,000 m (3,300 ft).

== Behavior ==
=== Feeding ===
The Chocó screech owl is usually found in the forest mid-story, but its foraging behavior has not been documented. Its diet is assumed to be large invertebrates and small vertebrates like that of other Megascops screech owls.

=== Breeding ===
The Chocó screech owl's breeding season appears to be January to March, based on the one nest that has been found and the collection of a female with a partially formed egg. The nest was in a natural cavity in the trunk of a dead tree. The bottom of the cavity contained bark, wood dust, dry leaves, pellets, remains of prey, and eggshell fragments.

=== Vocalization ===
The Chocó screech owl appears to have only one song, in contrast to most other screech owls that have primary (territorial) and secondary (courtship) songs. It is described as "short...trill with a rapid pace" that starts on an even pitch and then drops. The volume varies throughout.

== Status ==
The IUCN has not assessed the status of the Chocó screech owl as a separate species, but includes it with the Middle American screech owl (M. guatemalae). Though it appears to tolerate some habitat disturbance, it is absent from forest fragments surrounded by agriculture.
