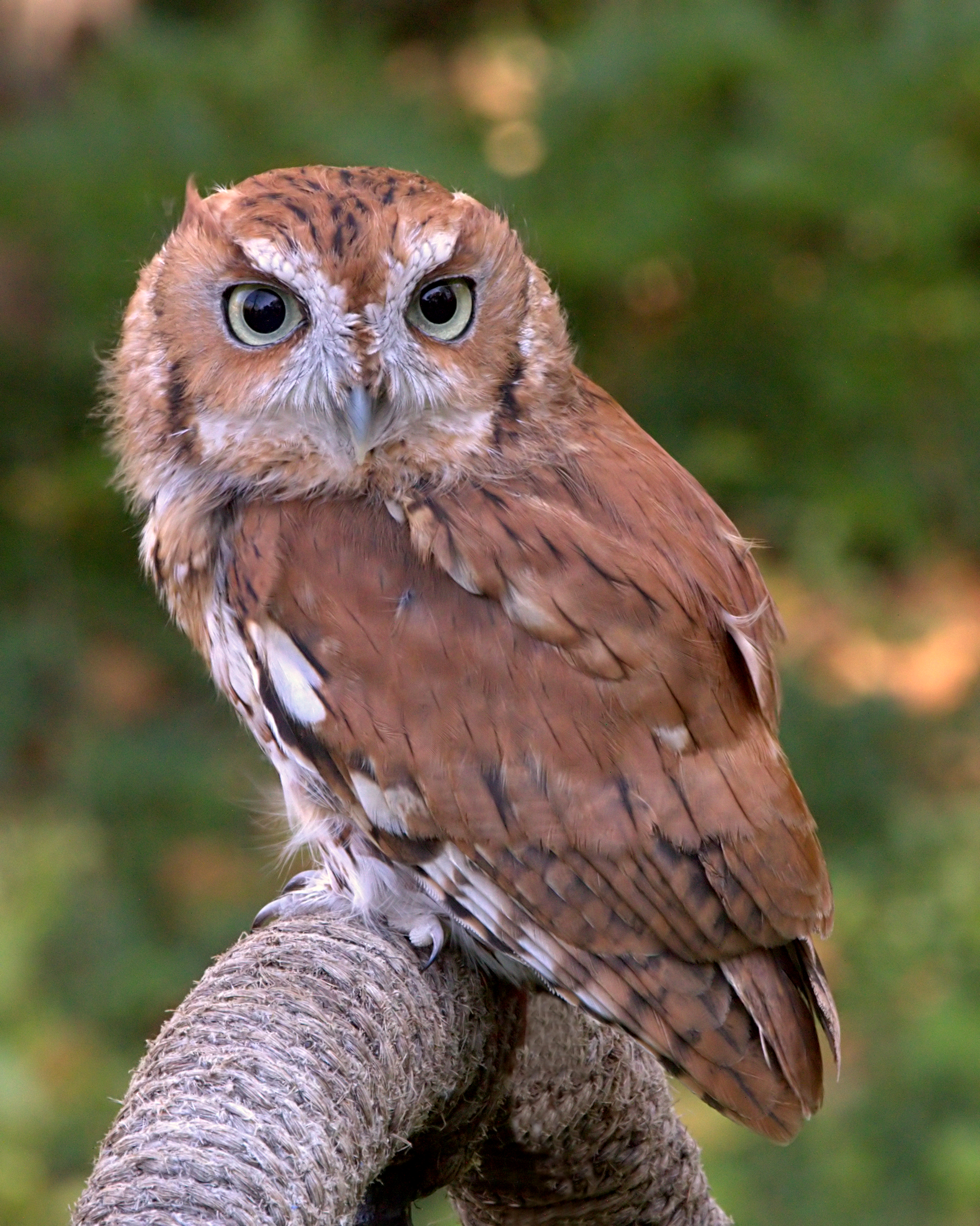
- Eastern screech owl, Megascops asio Rufous morph
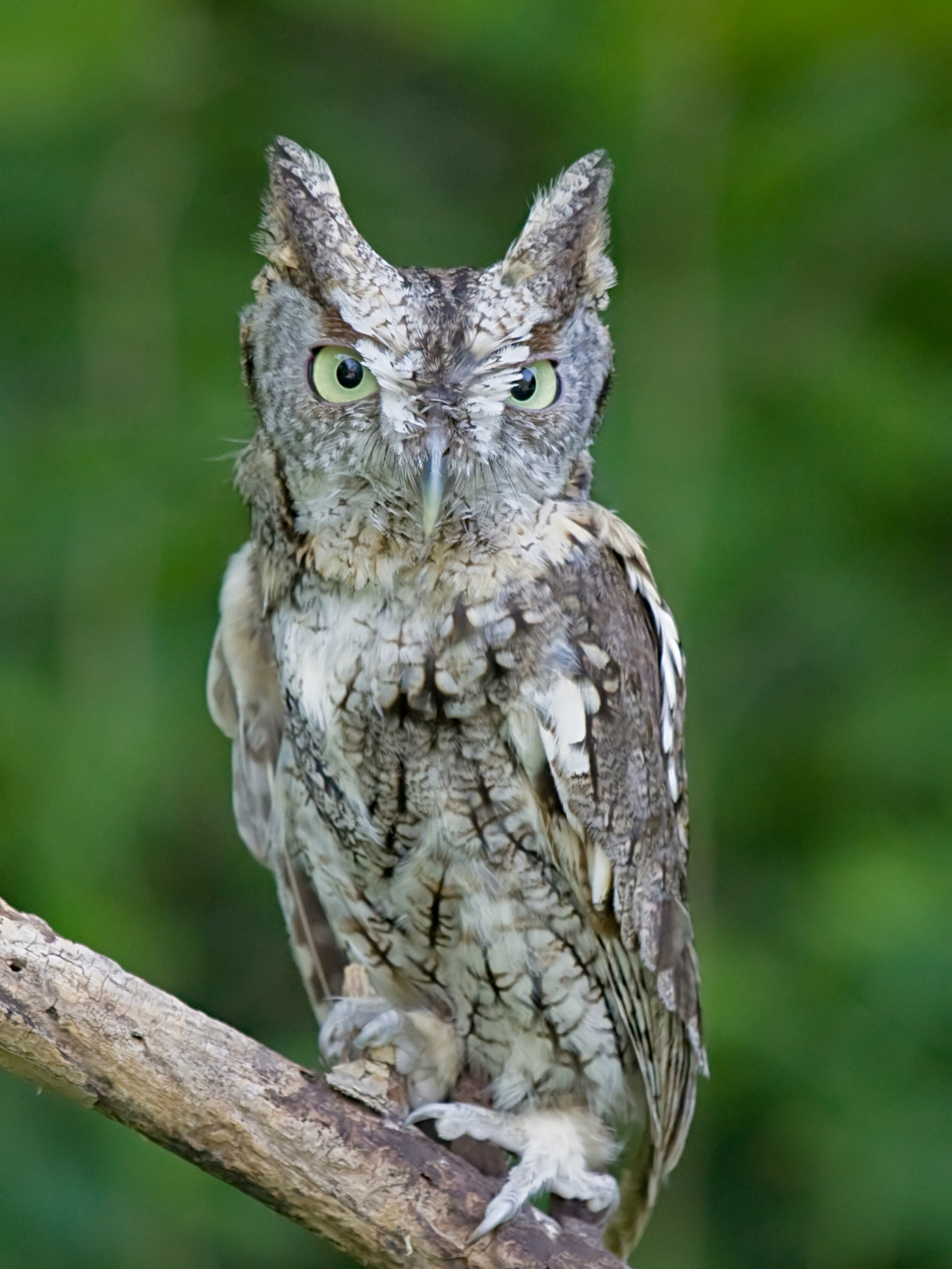
- Gray morph

Scientific classification
- Kingdom: Animalia
- Phylum: Chordata
- Class: Aves
- Order: Strigiformes
- Family: Strigidae
- Genus: Megascops; Kaup, 1848

Type species
- Strix acio Linnaeus, 1758

Species
- Some 22, see text

Synonyms
- Macabra Carlo Bonaparte, 1854

= Screech owl =

Screech owl Temporal range: Miocene to present

Species of owl

Screech owls are typical owls (Strigidae) belonging to the genus Megascops with 22 living species. For most of the 20th century, screech owls were considered part of the genus Otus along with the Old World scops owls but were reassigned to Megascops in the 2000s based on a range of behavioral, biogeographical, morphological, and DNA sequence data.

Screech owls are restricted to the Americas. Some species formerly placed with them are now considered more distinct (see below for details).

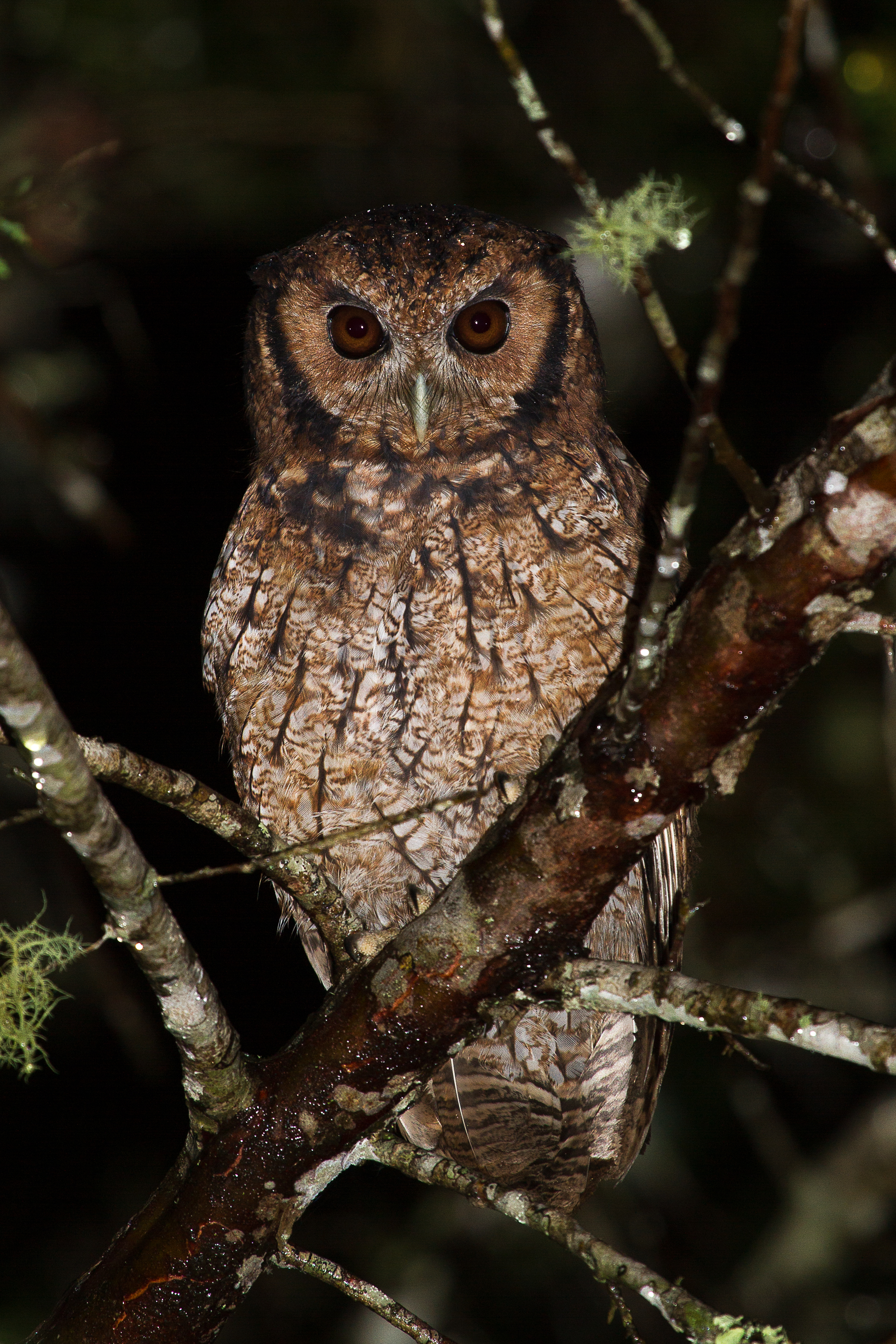
Long-tufted screech owl (Megascops sanctaecatarinae)

== Description ==
The screech owl is about 8 to 9 ¾ inches long and weighs about 5 ounces. It is known for its prominent tufted feathers, which give off the appearance of ears. It has tufts, yellow eyes, and a bill that combines the colors of black, gray, and green and is known for its unique feather coloring, as well, having distinct horizontal barring and vertical streaking, which contributes to its uniform dark coloration. However, it noticeably has white spotting on its shoulders.

== Ecology and behavior ==
Screech owls hunt from perches in semiopen landscapes. They prefer areas that contain old trees with hollows; these are home to their prey, which includes insects, reptiles, small mammals such as bats and mice, and small birds. Screech owls have a good sense of hearing, which helps them locate their prey in any habitat. They also possess well-developed raptorial claws and a curved bill, both of which are used for tearing their prey into pieces small enough to swallow easily. They usually carry their prey back to their nests, presumably to guard against the chance of losing their meal to a larger raptor.

Screech owls are primarily solitary. During the late winter breeding season, however, males make nests in cavities, sometimes reusing abandoned nests of other animals, to try to attract females. The females select their mate based on the quality of the cavity and the food located inside. During the incubation period, the male feeds the female. These birds are monogamous, with biparental care. The young of most screech owls are altricial to semialtricial.

Northern screech owls are found in eastern states, such as New Jersey and New York. The screech owls are named for their piercing calls. Their normal territorial call is not a hoot as with some owls, but a trill consisting of more than four individual calls per second given in rapid succession (although the sound does not resemble screeching or screaming). They also have a kind of "song" used in courtship, and as a duet, between members of a pair. Calls differ widely between species in type and pitch, and in the field are often the first indication of these birds' presence, as well as the most reliable means to distinguish between species. The distinctness of many species of screech owls was first realized when vastly differing calls of externally similar birds from adjacent regions were noted.

== Evolution ==
The genus Megascops was introduced by German naturalist Johann Jakob Kaup in 1848. The type species is the eastern screech owl (Megascops asio). The evolutionary relationships of the scops and screech owls are not entirely clear. What is certain is that they are very closely related; they may be considered sister lineages, which fill essentially the same ecological niche in their allopatric ranges. A screech owl fossil from the Late Pliocene of Kansas (which is almost identical to eastern and western screech owls) indicates a longstanding presence of these birds in the Americas, while coeval scops owl fossils very similar to the Eurasian scops owl have been found at S'Onix on Mallorca. The scops and screech owl lineage probably evolved at some time during the Miocene (like most other genera of typical owls), and the three (see below) modern lineages separated perhaps roughly 5 million years ago. Notably, no reliable estimate of divergence time is known, as Otus and Megascops are osteologically very similar, as is to be expected from a group that has apparently conserved its ecomorphology since before its evolutionary radiation. Like almost all scops and screech owls today, their common ancestor was in all probability already a small owl, with ear tufts and at least the upper tarsi ("leg") feathered.

However that may be, the hypothesis that the group evolved from Old World stock is tentatively supported by cytochrome b sequence data. The screech owls also have a different placement of the procoracoid (less of an anterior incline) and coracoid bones compared to other New World owls.

=== The splitting of Otus sensu lato ===
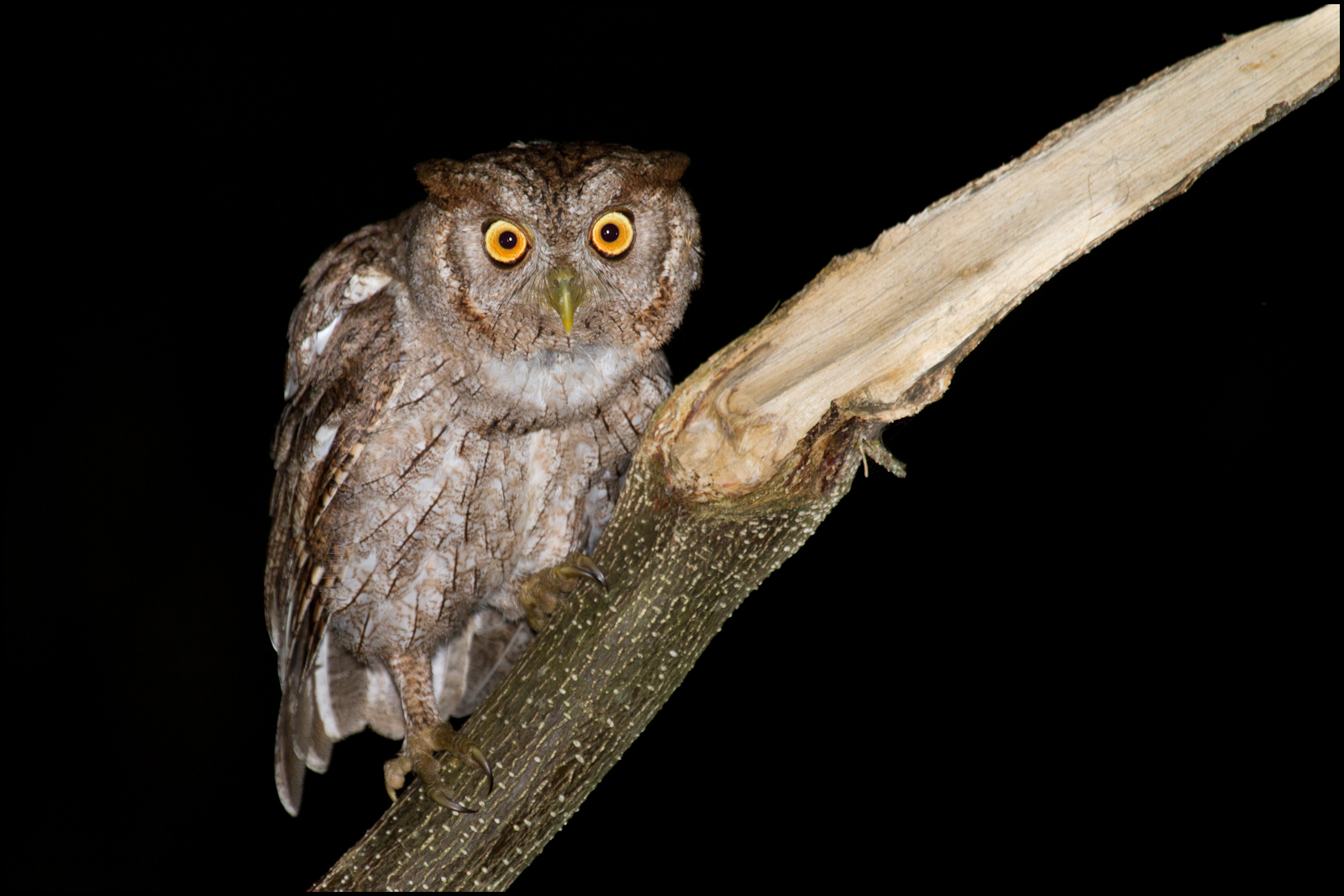
Pacific screech owl (Megascops cooperi)

While late 19th-century ornithologists knew little of the variation of these birds, which often live in far-off places, with every new taxon described, a few differences between the Old and New World "scops" owls became more and more prominent. Namely, the scops owls give a whistling call or a row of high-pitched hoots with fewer than four individual hoots per second. This call is given in social interaction or when the owl tries to scare away other animals. The screech owls, though, are named for their piercing trills of more than four individual notes per second, and as noted above, they also have a kind of song, which is absent in scops owls. A few other differences are seen, such as brown coloration below being common in scops owls and almost never seen in screech owls, but the difference in vocalizations is most striking.

By the mid-19th century, Otus was becoming identified as encompassing more than one genus. First, in 1848, the screech owls were split off as Megascops. Subsequently, the highly apomorphic white-throated screech owl of the Andes was placed in the monotypic genus Macabra in 1854. Gymnasio was established in the same year for the Puerto Rican owl, and the bare-legged owl (or "Cuban screech owl") was separated in Gymnoglaux the following year; the latter genus was sometimes merged with Gymnasio by later authors.

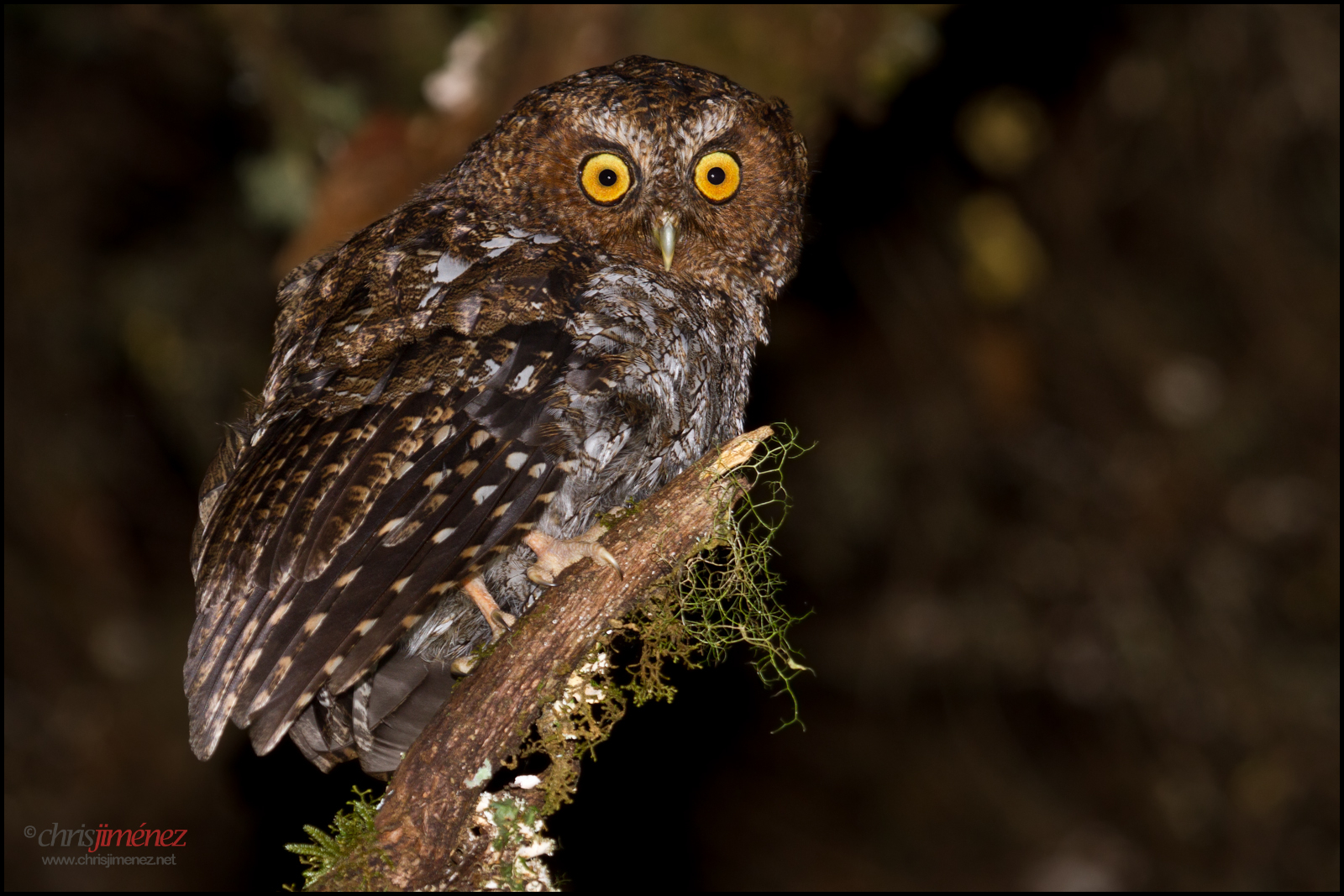
Bare-shanked screech owl (Megascops clarkii)

By the early 20th century, the lumping together of taxa had come to be preferred. The third edition of the American Ornithologists' Union (AOU) checklist in 1910 placed the screech owls back in Otus. Although this move was never unequivocally accepted, it was the dominant throughout most of the 20th century. In 1988, attempts to resolve this were made by re-establishing all those genera split some 140 years earlier at subgenus rank inside Otus. Still, the diversity and distinctness of the group failed to come together in a good evolutionary and phylogenetic picture, and until the availability of DNA sequence data, this could not be resolved. In the mid- to late 1990s, preliminary studies of mtDNA cytochrome b across a wide range of owls found that even the treatment as subgenera was probably unsustainable and suggested that most of the genera proposed around 1850 should be accepted. Though some debate arose about the reliability of these findings at first, they have been confirmed by subsequent studies. In 2003, the AOU formally accepted the genus Megascops again.

The bare-legged owl was also confirmed as distinct enough to warrant separation in its own genus. Furthermore, the white-throated screech owl was recognized as part of an ancient lineage of Megascops – including also the whiskered screech owl and the tropical screech owl, which previously were considered to be of unclear relationships – and indeed its call structure is not too dissimilar from the latter. Its distinct coloration, approximated in the southern whiskered screech owl (Megascops trichopsis mesamericanus), is thus likely the result of strong genetic drift.

Additionally, a population of the tropical screech owl from northern Colombia has recently been proposed as the Santa Marta screech owl (Megascops gilesi) to the IOC.

== Systematics ==
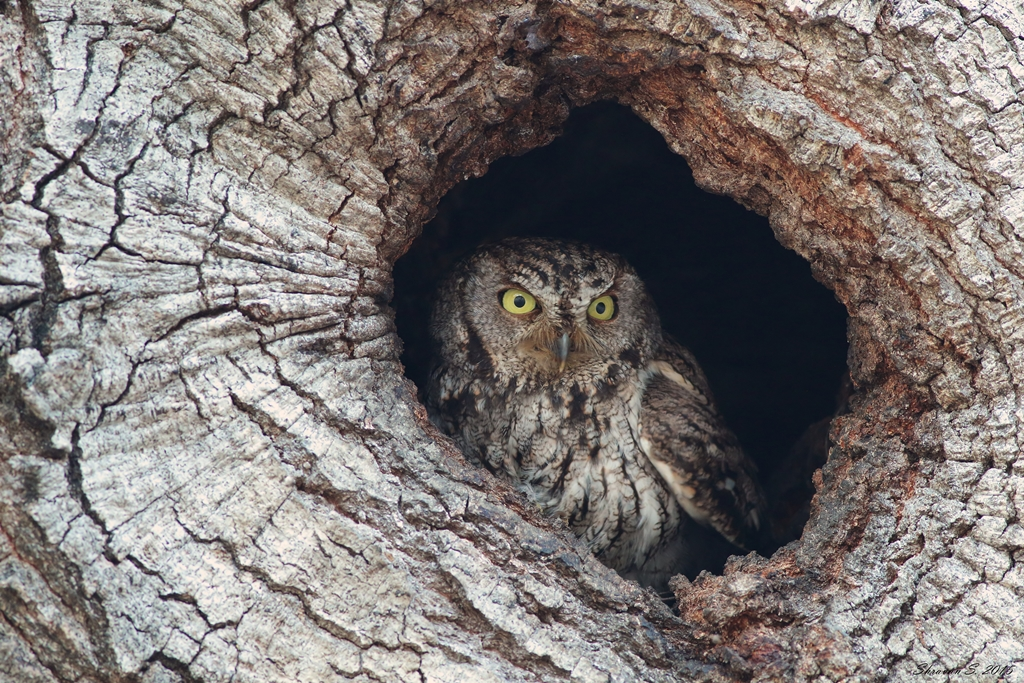
Western screech owl (Megascops kennicottii)

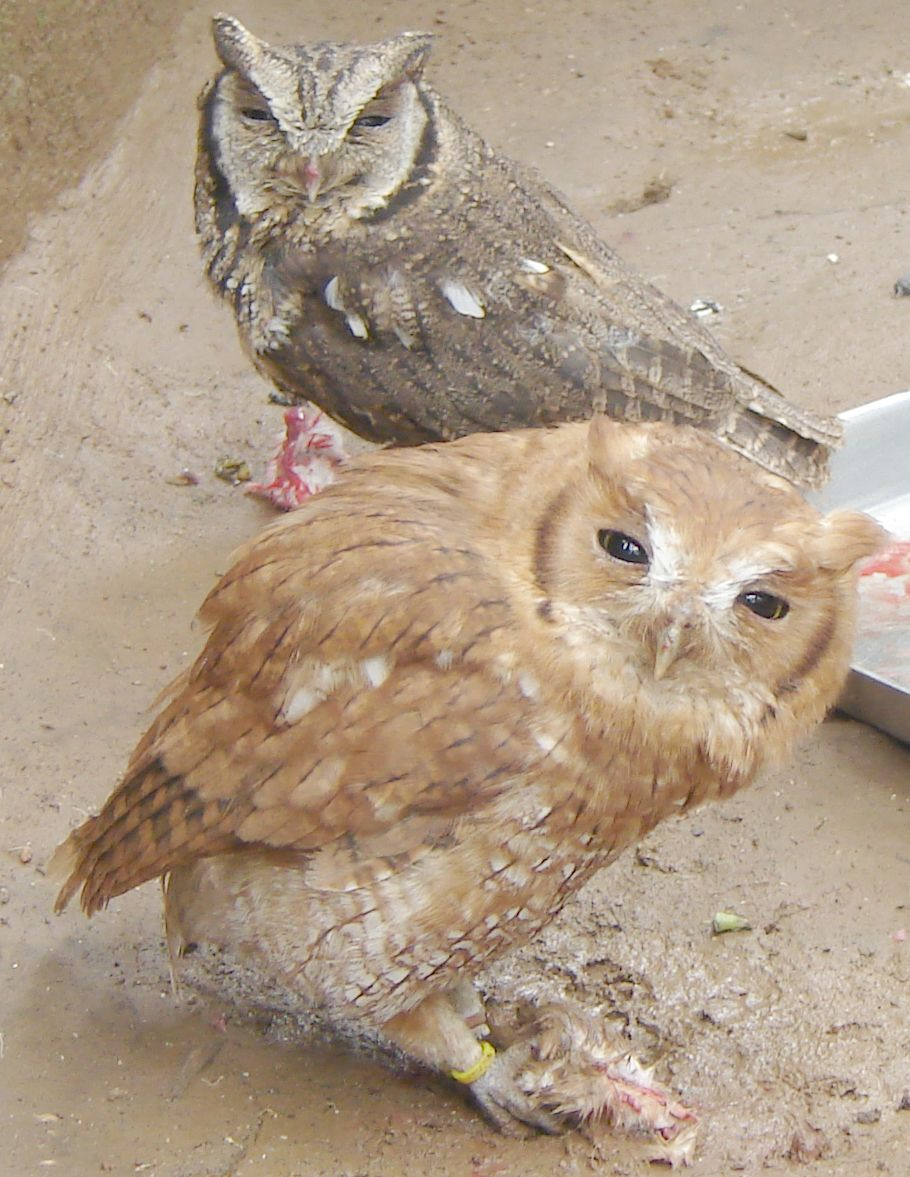
Rufous- and grey-morph individuals of the tropical screech owl (Megascops choliba)

The genus contains 22 species:

- Whiskered screech owl, Megascops trichopsis
- Bare-shanked screech owl, Megascops clarkii
- White-throated screech owl, Megascops albogularis
- Tropical screech owl, Megascops choliba
- Bearded screech owl, Megascops barbarus
- Pacific screech owl, Megascops cooperi
- Western screech owl, Megascops kennicottii
- Eastern screech owl, Megascops asio
- Balsas screech owl, Megascops seductus
- Alagoas screech owl, Megascops alagoensis – first described in 2021
- Middle American screech owl, Megascops guatemalae
  - Vermiculated screech owl, Megascops guatemalae vermiculatus
- Koepcke's screech owl, Megascops koepckeae
- Rufescent screech owl, Megascops ingens
- Cinnamon screech owl, Megascops petersoni
- Cloud-forest screech owl, Megascops marshalli
- Yungas screech owl, Megascops hoyi
- Xingu screech owl, Megascops stangiae – first described in 2021
- Chocó screech owl, Megascops centralis – split from M. guatemalae
- Foothill screech owl, Megascops roraimae – split from M. guatemalae
- Long-tufted screech owl, Megascops sanctaecatarinae
- Santa Marta screech owl, Megascops gilesi – first described in 2017
- West Peruvian screech owl, Megascops roboratus
- Tawny-bellied screech owl, Megascops watsonii
- Black-capped screech owl, Megascops atricapilla
