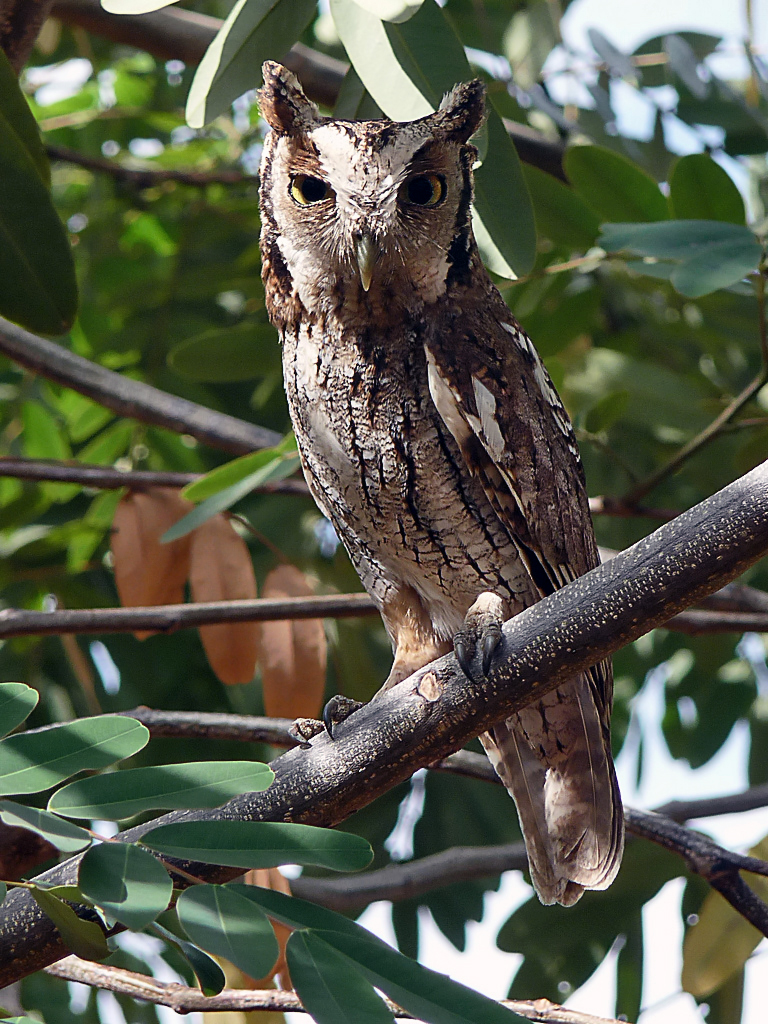
- In Ceara, Brazil
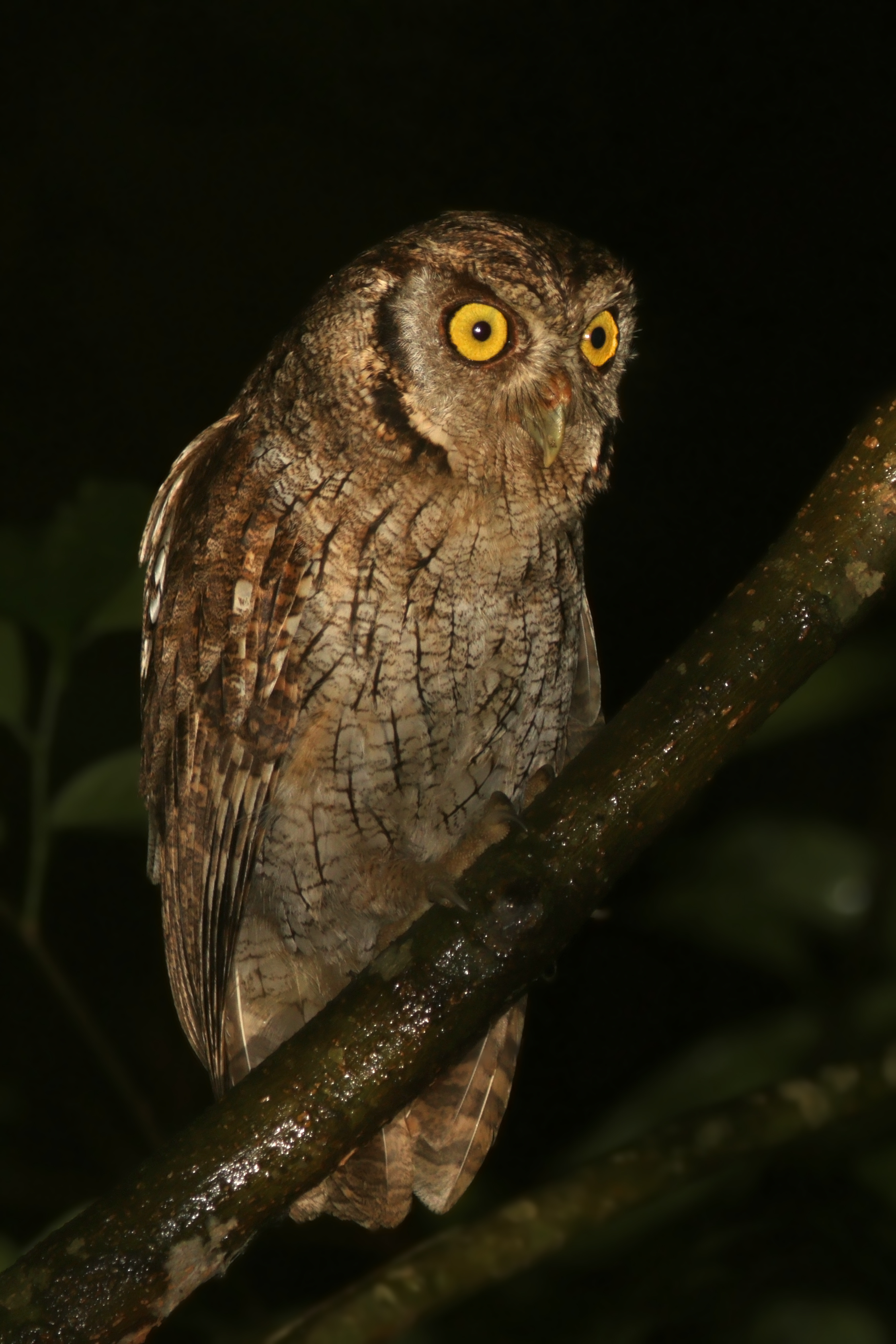
- Megascops choliba luctisomus, Panama

Conservation status
- Least Concern (IUCN 3.1)
- CITES Appendix II (CITES)

Scientific classification
- Kingdom: Animalia
- Phylum: Chordata
- Class: Aves
- Order: Strigiformes
- Family: Strigidae
- Genus: Megascops
- Species: M. choliba

Binomial name
- Megascops choliba (Vieillot, 1817)

Synonyms
- Otus choliba (Vieillot, 1817)

= Tropical screech owl =

Species of owl

The tropical screech owl (Megascops choliba) is a small species of owl in the family Strigidae. It is found in Costa Rica, Panama, Trinidad, and every mainland South American country.

== Taxonomy and systematics ==
The taxonomy of genus Megascops is somewhat unsettled. A 2015 publication proposed that the tropical screech owl's closest relatives are the white-throated screech owl (M. albogularis) and Koepcke's screech owl (M. koepckeae). However, the International Ornithological Committee (IOC) has not accepted that assessment.

The following nine subspecies are accepted by the IOC, the Clements taxonomy, and BirdLife International's Handbook of the Birds of the World. M. c. duidae perhaps represents a separate species.

- M. c. choliba Vieillot (1817)
- M. c. luctisomus Bangs & Pernard (1921)
- M. c. margaritae Cory (1915)
- M. c. cruciger Spix (1824)
- M. c. duidae Chapman (1929)
- M. c. decussatus Lichtenstein (1823)
- M. c. uruguaii Hekstra (1982)
- M. c. surutus Kelso (1941)
- M. c. wetmorei Brodkorb (1937)

== Description ==
The tropical screech owl is polymorphic, with much variation in color. It is overall gray-brown or (less commonly) brown or rufous, but always with a relatively distinctive blackish edge to the face and yellow irides. Its undersides are pale with a black "herringbone" pattern. The subspecies differ in the intensity of the colors and the amount of black markings on the upper- and underparts. Adults are 21 to 23 cm (8.3 to 9.1 in) long and weigh 97 to 160 g (3.4 to 5.6 oz).

== Distribution and habitat ==
The tropical screech owl is "the most common and widespread screech-owl of the neotropics." It is found from Costa Rica and Panama south and throughout South America (including Trinidad and Tobago), almost entirely east of the Andes, but not in the far south. The subspecies are distributed thus:

- M. c. choliba, southern Mato Grosso and São Paulo, Brazil, south to eastern Paraguay
- M. c. luctisomus, the Pacific slope in Costa Rica south to the Canal Zone in Panama, and on the Pearl Islands
- M. c. margaritae, restricted to Margarita Island off of northern Venezuela
- M. c. cruciger, Trinidad, and eastern Colombia and Venezuela east to the Guianas and south to eastern Peru
- M. c. duidae, Cerro Duida and Cerro de la Neblina in southern Venezuela
- M. c. decussatus, central and southern Brazil
- M. c. uruguaii, southeastern Brazil, northeastern Argentina, and Uruguay
- M. c. surutus, Bolivia
- M. c. wetmorei, Paraguay and Argentina

The tropical screech owl inhabits a wide variety of landscapes. Most tend to be partially to mostly open, such as secondary forest, open woodland, coffee plantations, residential areas, and the borders of terra firme and várzea forests. Except for M. c. duidae, it shuns the interior of forests; that subspecies is found in dense forest and bamboo scrub.

== Behavior and ecology ==
=== Feeding ===
The tropical screech owl is nocturnal. It forages by sallying from a low perch to capture prey on the ground, from branches, or in the air. Its diet is large arthropods and small vertebrates. The former include earthworms, scorpions, spiders, harvestmen, and a large variety of insects (such as grasshoppers, katydids, moths and caterpillars, ants, cockroaches, cicadas, termites, mantids, crickets, and beetles). Vertebrate prey includes small frogs, other amphibians, small reptiles (such as snakes), other birds, opossums, bats, and rodents.

=== Breeding ===
The tropical screech owl's breeding phenology has not been well studied. South of the Equator, the breeding season appears to start in August. The species nests in holes such as natural cavities, old woodpecker holes, and nest boxes. The clutch size is usually one to three but can be as large as six. Adults defend the nest with "fluffing" displays and aggressive moves that may extend to striking humans with their claws.

=== Vocalization ===
The tropical screech owl's primary song is "short, purring trill, followed by two accentuated clear notes". The female's song is similar to the male's but higher pitched. A secondary, courtship, song is "a bubbling bububúbubu". They also produce "a variety of cackles and longer hooting notes".

== Status ==
The IUCN has assessed the tropical screech owl as being of least concern. It is common in much of its large range, and deforestation may actually benefit it because it provides the more open habitat it frequents.
