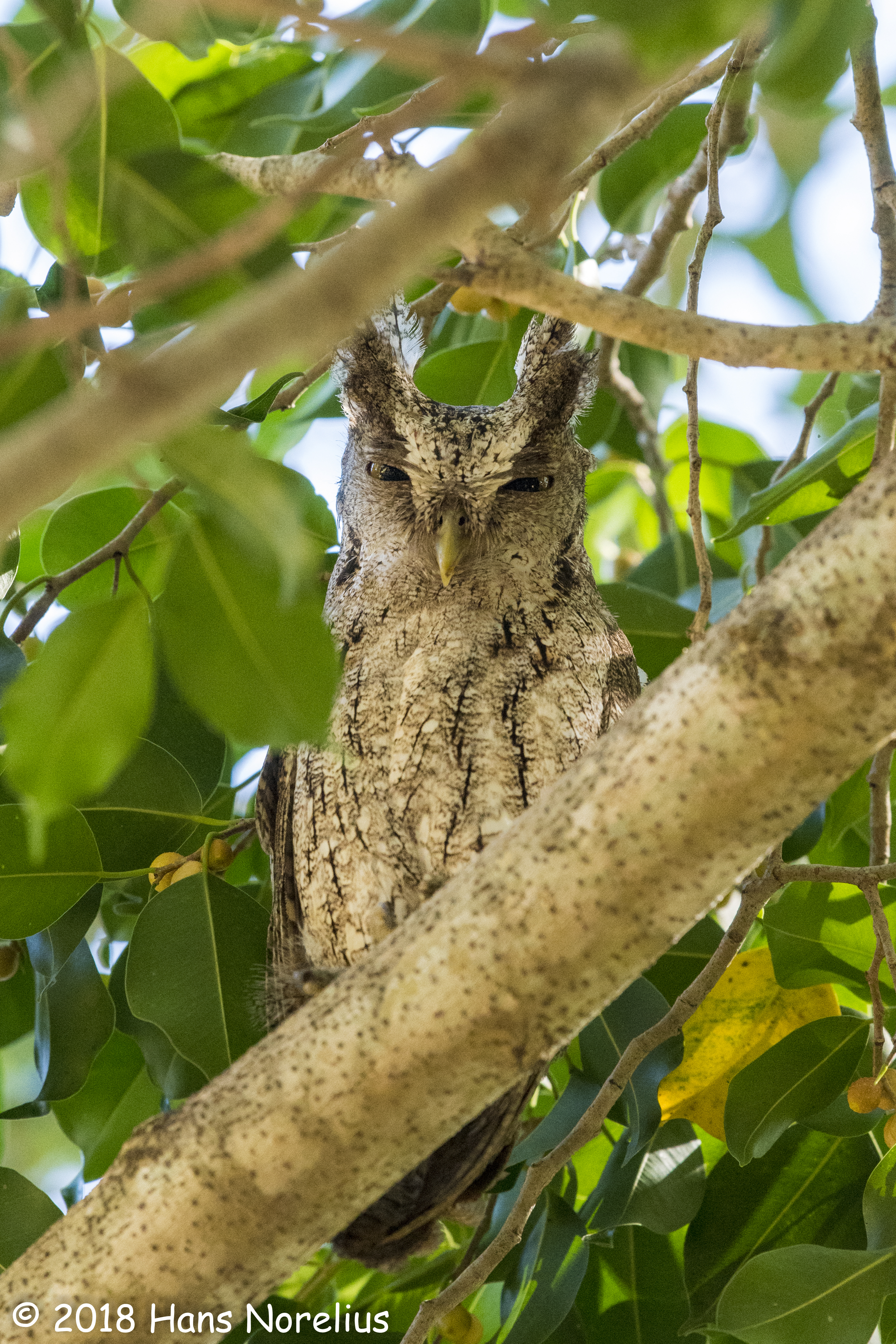
- Pacific Screech Owl, Costa Rica, January 2018

Conservation status
- Least Concern (IUCN 3.1)
- CITES Appendix II (CITES)

Scientific classification
- Kingdom: Animalia
- Phylum: Chordata
- Class: Aves
- Order: Strigiformes
- Family: Strigidae
- Genus: Megascops
- Species: M. cooperi

Binomial name
- Megascops cooperi (Ridgway, 1878)

Synonyms
- Otus cooperi (Ridgway, 1878)

= Pacific screech owl =

Species of owl

The Pacific screech owl (Megascops cooperi) is a species of owl in the family Strigidae. It is found in Costa Rica, El Salvador, Guatemala, Honduras, Mexico, and Nicaragua. The Pacific screech owl has sometimes been treated as a race of western screech owl (Megascops kennicottii) or eastern screech owl (M. asio) but its vocalizations are distinct from theirs. Two subspecies are recognized, the nominate M. c. cooperi and M. c. lambi. The latter has also sometimes been treated as a separate species. The IUCN has assessed the Pacific screech owl as being of Least Concern. Its population is estimated to exceed 50,000 mature individuals but is believed to be decreasing.

== Description ==
The Pacific screech owl is a medium-sized member of Megascops and has prominent "ear" tufts and bright yellow eyes. The nominate subspecies is 23 to 26 cm (9.1 to 10.2 in) long and weighs 145 to 175 g (5.1 to 6.2 oz). Its facial disc is pale gray with a white and blackish border. Its crown and upperparts are a pale tawny gray with dusky and black vermiculation. Its closed wing shows two pale lines. It has paler off-white underparts with a darker herringbone pattern. M. c. lambi is 20 to 22 cm (7.9 to 8.7 in) long and weighs 115 to 130 g (4.1 to 4.6 oz). It is colored like the nominate with the addition of dark bars and streaks on the crown.

== Distribution and habitat ==
The more northern subspecies of Pacific screech owl, M. c. lambi, is found only on the Pacific slope of Oaxaca, Mexico. The nominate subspecies is found from eastern Oaxaca and Chiapas, Mexico, south along the Pacific slope through Guatemala, Honduras, El Salvador, and Nicaragua into northwestern Costa Rica. In the southern part of its range it can also be found on the upper Caribbean slope.

The Pacific screech owl inhabits a wide variety of vegetation communities. They include swamp forest and mangroves, arid and semi-arid woodland and scrub, open country with scattered trees and cacti, and secondary forest. In elevation it ranges from sea level as high as 1,000 m (3,300 ft) in Oaxaca and 1,300 m (4,300 ft) in Costa Rica but is usually found much lower.

== Behavior ==
=== Feeding ===
The Pacific screech owl is nocturnal and crepuscular. It hunts in clearings and the edges of woodland from a low perch and captures prey by pouncing or sallying. Its diet is mostly large insects but also includes other arthropods such as scorpions and small vertebrates like birds and flying squirrels.

=== Breeding ===
The Pacific screech owl's breeding phenology is not well known. It is thought to breed in the dry season. The clutch of three or four eggs is laid in a tree cavity, often an old woodpecker hole.

=== Vocalization ===
The primary songs of the two Pacific screech owl subspecies differ. That of the nominate has been described as "prrr pu-pu-PU-PU-PU-pu-pu" and that of M. c. lambi a "staccato croarrr-gogogogogogok". Both have secondary songs as well.
