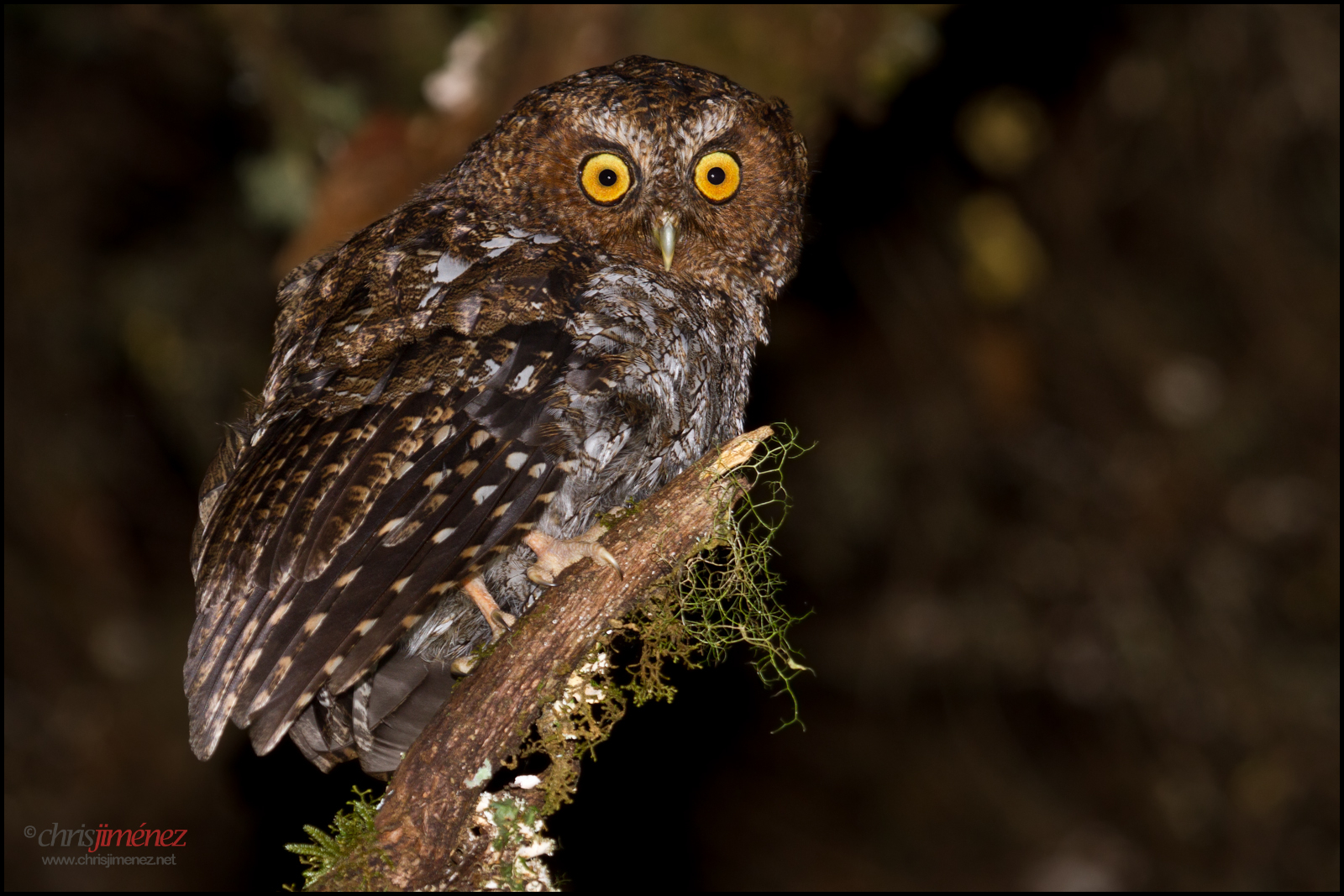

Conservation status
- Least Concern (IUCN 3.1)
- CITES Appendix II (CITES)

Scientific classification
- Kingdom: Animalia
- Phylum: Chordata
- Class: Aves
- Order: Strigiformes
- Family: Strigidae
- Genus: Megascops
- Species: M. clarkii

Binomial name
- Megascops clarkii (Kelso, L & Kelso, EH, 1935)

Synonyms
- Otus clarkii Kelso & Kelso, 1935

= Bare-shanked screech owl =

Species of owl

The bare-shanked screech owl (Megascops clarkii) is a species of owl in the family Strigidae. It is a large owl that feeds at night in forests and lives in a family size group, even during breeding season. The owl's range is only in Costa Rica, Panama, and far northwestern Colombia. The owl preys on large insects, shrews, and small rodents.

== Identification ==
The owl is 23 cm (9 in) to 25 cm (10 in) long, 173-190 mm long, and weighs 123-190 g. Its upperbody is reddish-brown and is "spotted, mottled, and vermiculated with black". Its hindneck is yellowish and the feathers on its shoulder has a white band across them, edged with black. The flight feathers have cinnamon-colored bars, while the tail has light and dark bars. Underneath the owl, it is pale brown with a tan and yellowish tint. Its upper breast is partially white, while the lower breast and stomach have either dusky reddish-brown bars or markings with black streaks. The facial disc is yellowish-brown with a dark ruff and its eyes are yellow. Its bill is either greenish-grey or bluish-grey. The owl's thighs are mostly yellow. Its lower leg is bare as well as its yellowish-pink toes that have dark claws. Chicks are whitish while the fledglings are cinnamon-colored with white speckles and dusky bars. Fledglings are also dull-yellowish below with yellowish-brown bars. It is large compared to other Megascops species, which are also normally found at lower elevations. The vermiculated screech owl resembles the owl and they sometimes occupy the same elevation.

Its call has short low-pitched whistles that are steady. Either the second or third notes are the loudest. The female's call has a higher pitch than the male.

== Habitat and range ==
Its habitat is in mountain forests that are dense and humid, along with the edges of forests and in cloud forests that have an elevation of 3,000 to 7,600 feet. Sometimes, the elevation is almost 11,000 feet high. Although the owl can sometimes be found in thinner upland forests, it still requires a patchy forest. The owl's range is only in Costa Rica, Panama, and far northwestern Colombia. It can also be located in the Monteverde Biological Reserve and Volcán Poás National Park within Costa Rica. The owl has been barely studied and its conservation status is unknown according to a 2017 book, but the IUCN Red List ranks it as least concern.

== Breeding and feeding ==
The owl can be found in groups that are the size of a family, including during breeding season. Its nesting has only been studied once, within an oak tree's cavity. It lays eggs from mid-February through May. Fledglings can be observed from May to August. It hunts at night along the edges of forests, clearings, or canopies. The owl preys on large insects, shrews, and small rodents.
