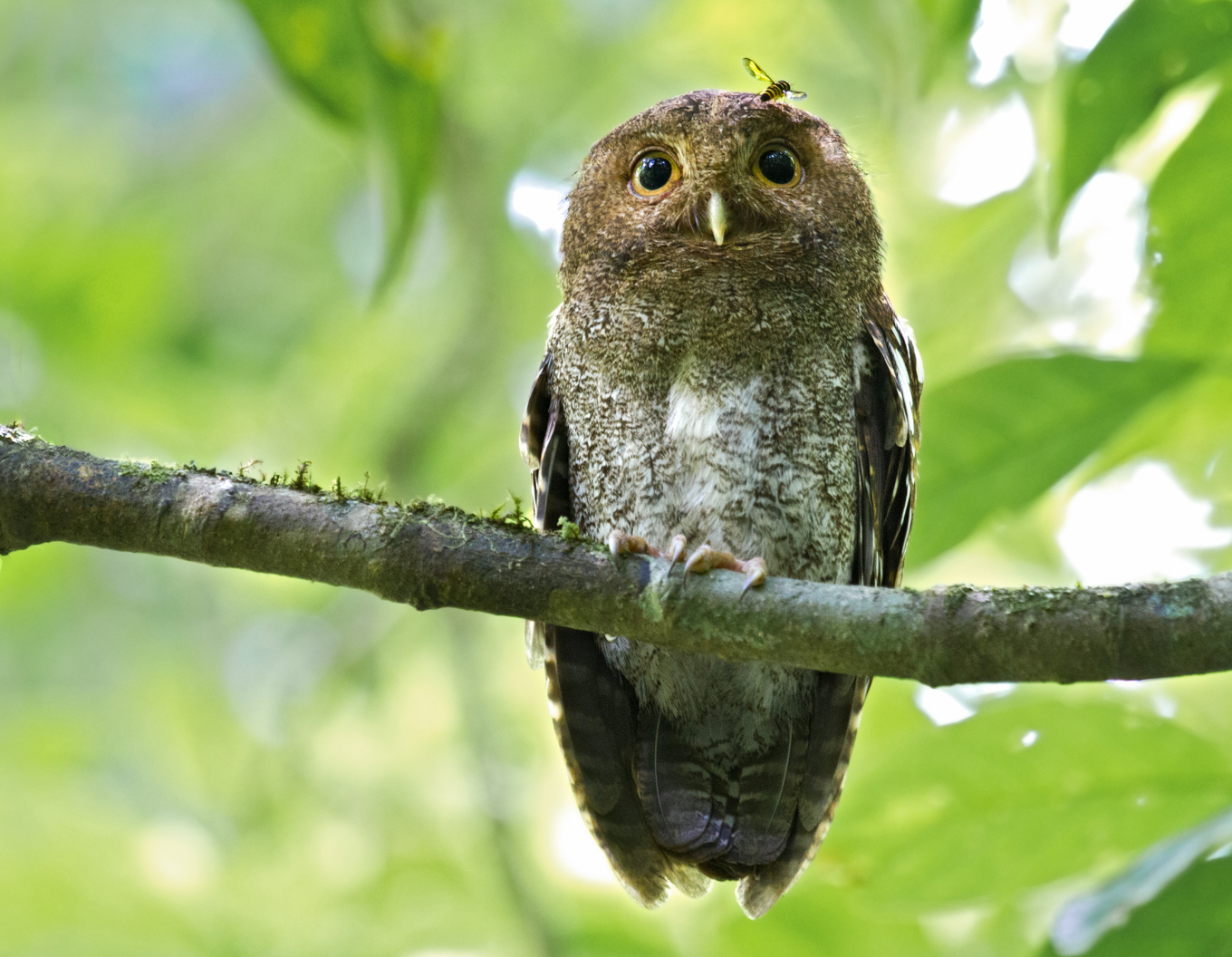

Conservation status
- Least Concern (IUCN 3.1)
- CITES Appendix II (CITES)

Scientific classification
- Domain: Eukaryota
- Kingdom: Animalia
- Phylum: Chordata
- Class: Aves
- Order: Strigiformes
- Family: Strigidae
- Genus: Megascops
- Species: M. guatemalae
- Subspecies: M. g. vermiculatus

Trinomial name
- Megascops guatemalae vermiculatus (Ridgway, 1887)

Synonyms
- Megascops guatemalae vermiculatus

= Vermiculated screech owl =

Species of owl

The vermiculated screech owl (Megascops guatemalae vermiculatus), is a subspecies of Middle American screech owl, or possibly separate species of owl in the family Strigidae. It is found in Costa Rica, Nicaragua, and Panama.

== Taxonomy and systematics ==
The taxonomy of the vermiculated screech owl is unsettled. The North American Classification Committee of the American Ornithological Society (AOS/NACC), the International Ornithological Committee (IOC), and the Clements taxonomy treat it as a subspecies of the Middle American screech owl (M. guatemalae). BirdLife International's Handbook of the Birds of the World treats it as a separate species.

What is now the foothill screech owl (M. roraimae) was once considered a subspecies of the vermiculated screech owl.

== Description ==
The vermiculated screech owl is 20 to 23 cm (7.9 to 9.1 in) long and weighs 91 to 128 g (3.2 to 4.5 oz). It is dimorphic, with one morph brown and the other overall rufous. Unlike most other owls of the same genus, it has feathered feet. The brown morph has a light brown facial disc with a thin dark border, indistinct pale brows over yellow eyes, and short dark "ear" tufts. Its crown and upperparts range from grayish brown to buffy brown with fine uniform vermiculations. The underparts are whitish with dense fine brown and black vermiculation. The beak is gray-green. The rufous morph is bright rufous on its head and upperparts.

== Distribution and habitat ==
The vermiculated screech-owl is found from far southern Nicaragua through the Caribbean side of Costa Rica into western Panama. It inhabits humid forest from sea level to about 1,200 m (3,900 ft).

== Behavior ==
=== Feeding ===
Almost nothing is known about the vermiculated screech owl's hunting practices or diet. It is presumed to mostly eat large insects but also small vertebrates.

=== Breeding ===
The vermiculated screech owl's breeding phenology is also very poorly known. It nests in a natural tree cavity or abandoned woodpecker hole, apparently in March. The clutch size is thought to be three.

=== Vocalization ===
The vermiculated screech owl's primary song is a "very fast, long, toad-like trill". Its probable secondary song is "a very brief descending purr".

== Status ==
The IUCN has assessed the vermiculated screech owl as being of Least Concern. However, because it needs unbroken forest, "[f]orest destruction a threat, at least in long term."
