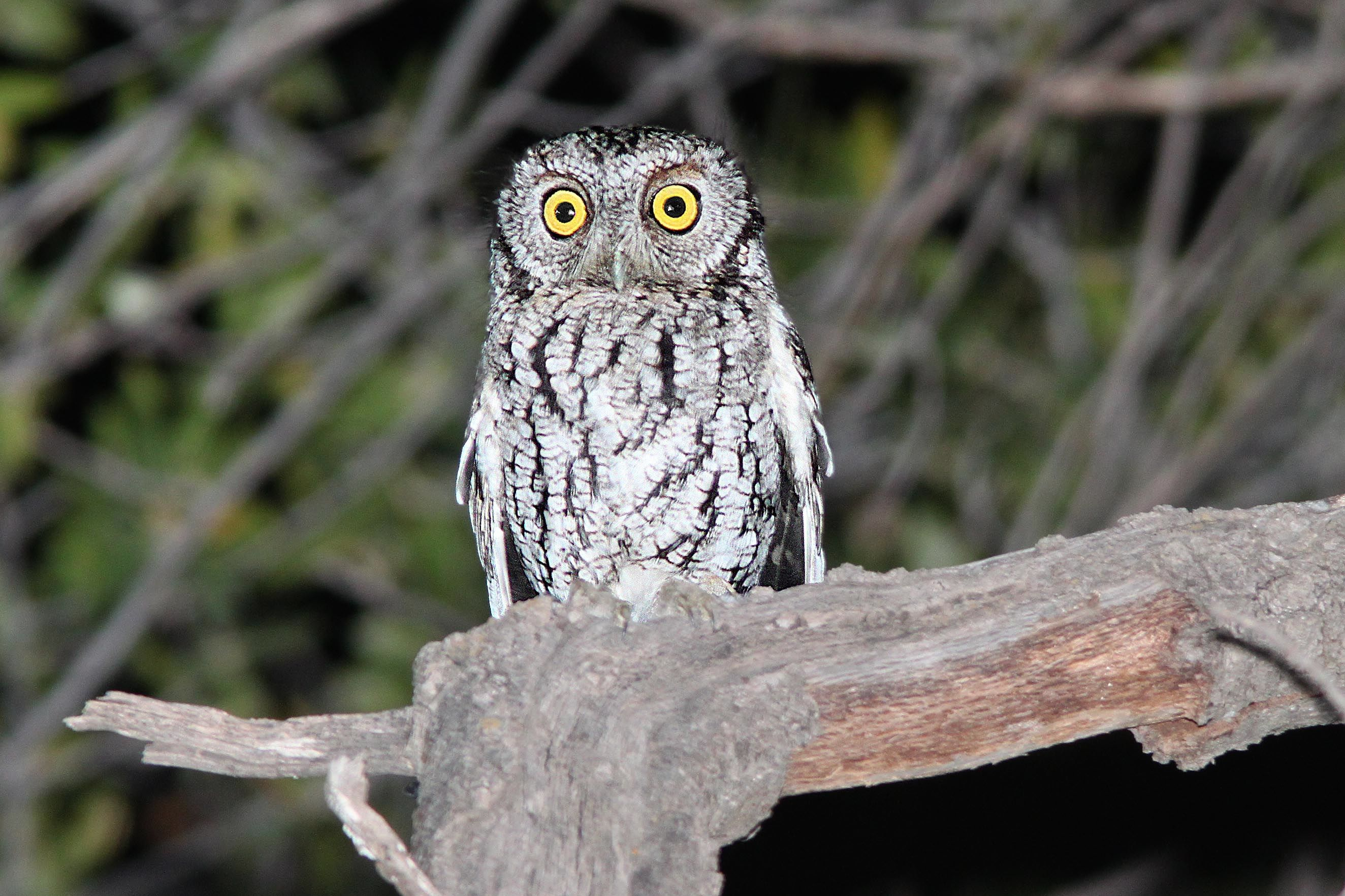

Conservation status
- Least Concern (IUCN 3.1)
- CITES Appendix II

Scientific classification
- Kingdom: Animalia
- Phylum: Chordata
- Class: Aves
- Order: Strigiformes
- Family: Strigidae
- Genus: Megascops
- Species: M. trichopsis

Binomial name
- Megascops trichopsis (Wagler, 1832)

Subspecies
- See text.

Synonyms
- Otus trichopsis

= Whiskered screech owl =

Species of owl

The whiskered screech owl (Megascops trichopsis) is a small screech owl found in North and Central America.

== Description ==
Adults occur in 2 color morphs, in either brown or dark grey plumage. They have a round head with ear tufts, yellow eyes and a yellowish bill. The bird looks very similar to a western screech owl, but has heavier barring on the breast, and is slightly smaller in size. They are 6.3 to 7.9 in and have a wingspan of 17.3 in.

== Range and habitat ==
The whiskered screech owl's range extends from southeasternmost Arizona and southwest New Mexico (the Madrean sky islands region) in the United States, southwards through Mexico, Guatemala, El Salvador, Honduras, to north central Nicaragua. Their breeding habitat is dense coniferous or oak woodlands, and coffee plantations usually occurring at higher elevations than the western screech owl.

== Behavior ==
These birds wait on a perch and swoop down on prey; they also capture targeted food items in flight. They mainly eat small mammals and large insects, with grasshoppers, beetles, and moths making up a large portion of their diet but, they also eat katydids and scorpions. They are active at night or near dusk, using their excellent hearing and night vision to locate prey.

The most common call is a series of about 8 regularly spaced "boo" notes, slightly higher in the middle, slightly lower at each end.

3 to 4 eggs are usually laid in April or May, usually found in a tree cavity or old woodpecker hole 5 to 7 meters above the ground.

== Subspecies ==
There are 3 recognized subspecies:

- Megascops trichopsis aspersus Brewster, 1888
- Megascops trichopsis mesamericanus (Van Rossem, 1932)
- Megascops trichopsis trichopsis (Wagler, 1832)
