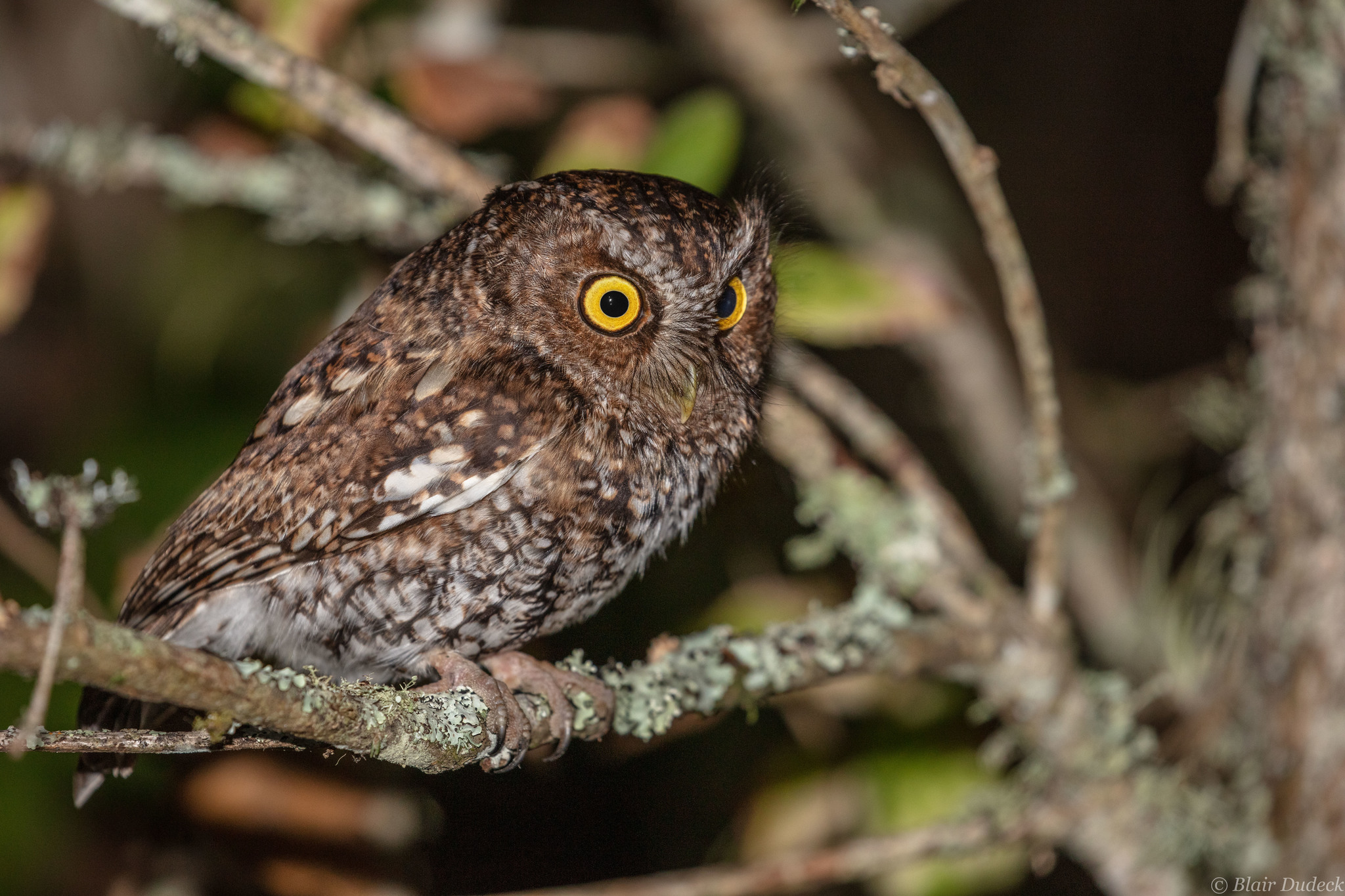

Conservation status
- Least Concern (IUCN 3.1)
- CITES Appendix II

Scientific classification
- Kingdom: Animalia
- Phylum: Chordata
- Class: Aves
- Order: Strigiformes
- Family: Strigidae
- Genus: Megascops
- Species: M. barbarus

Binomial name
- Megascops barbarus (Sclater, PL & Salvin, 1868)

Synonyms
- Otus barbarus (P.L.Sclater & Salvin, 1868)

= Bearded screech owl =

Species of owl

The bearded screech owl or Santa Barbara screech owl (Megascops barbarus) is a small "typical owl" in subfamily Striginae. It is found in Guatemala and Mexico.

== Taxonomy and systematics ==
The bearded screech owl was first described by Philip Sclater and Osbert Salvin in 1868. It shares genus Megascops with more than 20 other screech owls. It is monotypic. The specific epithet barbarus is derived from the type locality of Santa Bárbara, Vera Paz, Guatemala, and "bearded" is apparently an errant derivation of it (bearded would be barbatus).

== Description ==
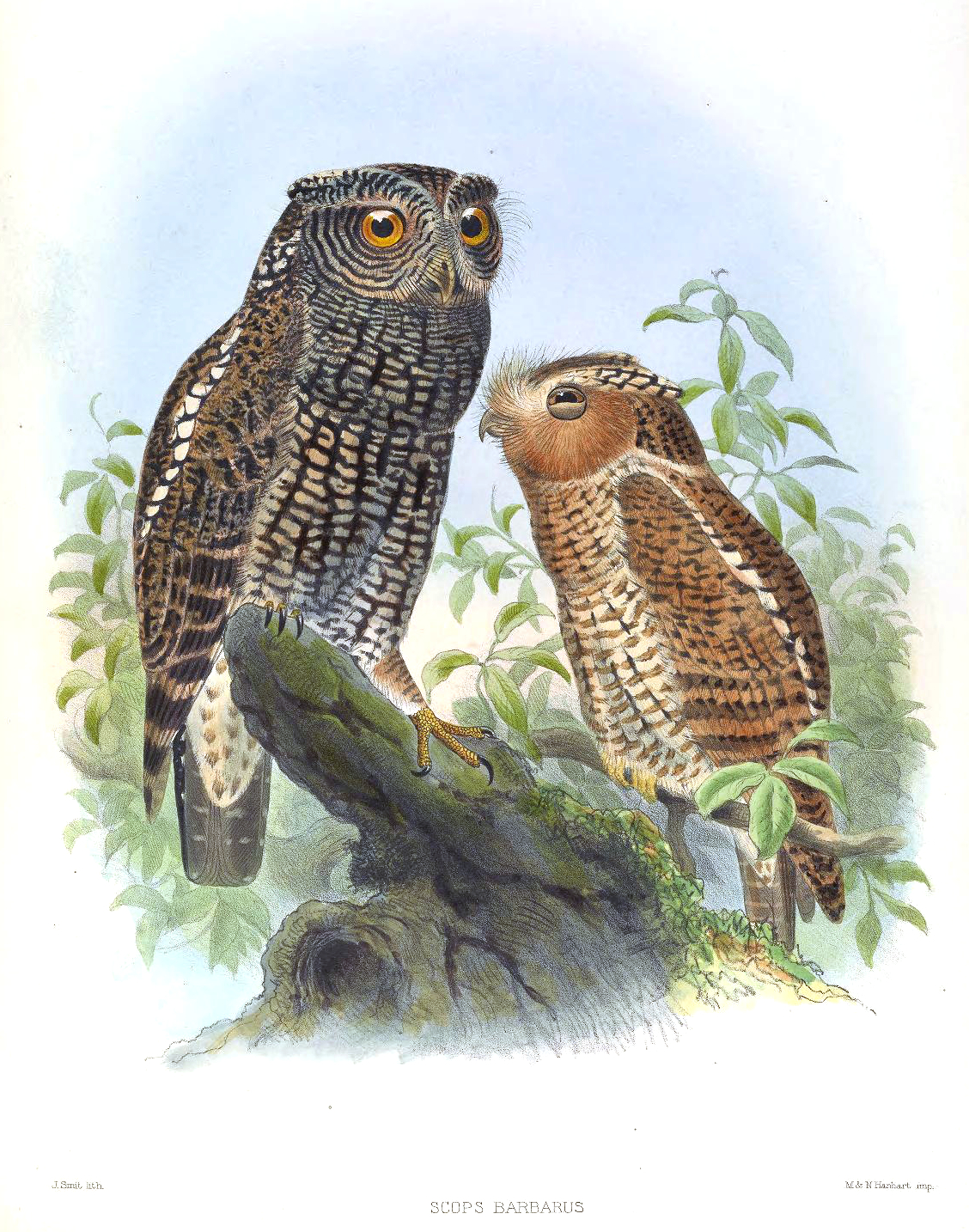
Illustration by Joseph Smit (1869)

The bearded screech owl is the smallest of its genus in North America. It is 16 to 20 cm (6.3 to 7.9 in) long; males weigh about 63 g (2.2 oz) and females 72 g (2.5 oz). In addition to being heavier, females have somewhat longer wings and tails, and in both sexes the wings extend past the tail. The species has two color morphs. In general the predominant one is light gray-brown and the other dark reddish, but more females seem to be of the reddish morph. Intermediates are known. Adults of the gray-brown morph have upperparts of that color with a "collar" and heavy spotting of whitish gray. The facial disc is also gray-brown surrounded by blackish brown. The underparts are pale with darker markings that give an ocellated appearance and feathering extends almost to the toes. The reddish morph replaces the gray-brown with dark reddish brown and the spotting and ocellated appearance are less distinct. Both morphs have a yellow eye, a greenish bill, and unfeathered pink toes.

== Distribution and habitat ==
The bearded screech owl is found from the highlands of central Chiapas, Mexico south and east into the highlands of central and western Guatemala. In elevation it mostly ranges between 1,800 and 2,000 m (5,900 and 6,600 ft) but occurs as low as 1,350 m (4,400 ft) and as high as 2,500 m (8,200 ft). It inhabits humid temperate montane forest of several types; examples include pine-oak, oak, and cloudforest.

== Behavior ==
=== Movement ===
The bearded screech owl is resident throughout its range.

=== Feeding ===
The bearded screech owl is entirely nocturnal. It feeds almost exclusively on arthropods, especially beetles, with crickets, moths, roaches, spiders, and scorpions also taken. It hunts in the understory or forest edge, waiting on a perch and pouncing on prey on the ground. It does not take the prey to a perch but eats it where captured. It does not appear to cast pellets.

=== Breeding ===
The bearded screech owl is territorial. Its breeding season appears to span from March to June. The only nest ever found was in a natural tree cavity where a reddish female was brooding a gray chick.

=== Vocalization ===
The bearded screech owl's territorial song is "a quiet and low-pitched, cricket-like trill of 3-5 [seconds] in duration, rising and dropping at the end." Both sexes sing, the males more often, and the male's song has a lower pitch than the female's. They also give "a soft ventriloquial hu."

== Status ==
The IUCN originally assessed the bearded screech owl as Near Threatened. In 2012 it changed the rating to Vulnerable and in 2020 to Least Concern. Its population has an estimated size of at least 20,000 mature individuals but is believed to be decreasing. Its total range is estimated at 9,800 km^{2} (3,800 sq mi). Mexican officials have listed it as endangered in that country due to extensive deforestation. "[C]loud and humid pine-oak forests in good condition are restricted in high slopes or high mountains that are of difficult access."
