= Cinnamon screech owl =

- Cinnamon Screech-Owl (Megascops petersoni) in Peru

Conservation status
- Least Concern (IUCN 3.1)
- CITES Appendix II

Scientific classification
- Kingdom: Animalia
- Phylum: Chordata
- Class: Aves
- Order: Strigiformes
- Family: Strigidae
- Genus: Megascops
- Species: M. petersoni

Binomial name
- Megascops petersoni (Fitzpatrick & O'Neill, 1986)

Synonyms
- Otus petersoni Fitzpatrick & O'Neill, 1986

Species of owl

The cinnamon screech owl (Megascops petersoni) is a species of owl in the family Strigidae. It is found in the Andes of Ecuador and Peru and possibly Colombia.

== Taxonomy and systematics ==
The cinnamon screech owl was first described to science in 1986, one of several Megascops owls described at about that time. Its specific epithet honors Roger Tory Peterson, "the father of modern field guides". Its exact relationships to others of its genus are inexact, but it is thought to be most closely related to the rufescent screech owl (M. ingens) and cloud-forest screech owl (M. marshalli). It is monotypic.

== Description ==
The cinnamon screech owl is a small screech owl, 23 to 24 cm (9.1 to 9.4 in) long and weighing 88 to 119 g (3.1 to 4.2 oz). Adults have a warm brown facial disc with a blackish border and the rest of the face is buffy. They have dark brown eyes, a blue-gray bill, and medium-length "ear" tufts. Their upper parts are cinnamon brown with fine darker brown and buffy vermiculation. The wings and tail are cinnamon with brownish and blackish bars. Their undersides are a rich cinnamon buff with some warm brown wavy marks on the throat and chest. No juvenile has been described.

== Distribution and habitat ==
According to the International Ornithological Committee (IOC) and the Clements taxonomy, the cinnamon screech owl is only known to occur on the eastern slope of the Andes from southern Ecuador into northern Peru. However, the South American Classification Committee of the American Ornithological Society (AOS/SACC) also places it in Colombia. It may also occur further south in Peru. It inhabits humid montane forest at elevations between 1,650 and 2,225 m (5,413 and 7,300 ft) in Ecuador and 1,700 and 2,450 m (5,580 and 8,040 ft) in Peru.

== Behavior ==
=== Feeding ===
The cinnamon screech owl is nocturnal, like most others of its genus. Almost nothing is known about its hunting practices or diet, though the latter includes large arthropods and probably small vertebrates.

=== Breeding ===
The cinnamon screech owl's breeding season, nest, and eggs have not been described. It is assumed to nest in tree cavities like others of its genus.

=== Vocalization ===
The cinnamon screech owl's primary (territorial) song is "a flat series of hoots" similar to but faster than that of the rufescent screech owl. Its aggressive song is described as "pu-pu-pu-pu-pu pu pu pu pu pu" that starts fast, abruptly slows, and rises in pitch.

== Status ==
The IUCN has assessed the cinnamon screech owl as being of Least Concern. However, "As is true of all species that are restricted for humid forest, Cinnamon Screech-Owl is vulnerable to habitat loss, degradation, and forest fragmentation."
