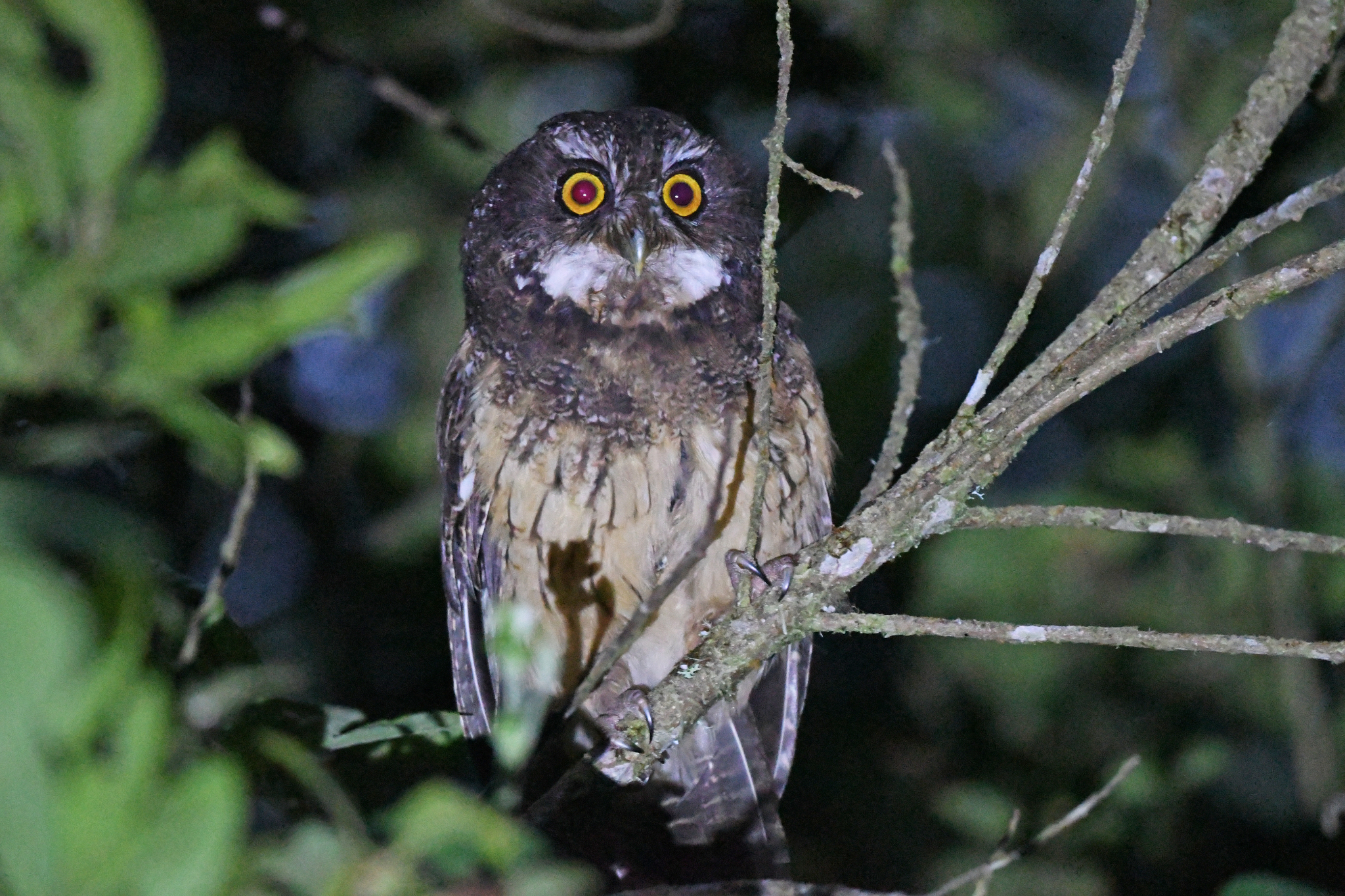

Conservation status
- Least Concern (IUCN 3.1)
- CITES Appendix II

Scientific classification
- Kingdom: Animalia
- Phylum: Chordata
- Class: Aves
- Order: Strigiformes
- Family: Strigidae
- Genus: Megascops
- Species: M. albogularis

Binomial name
- Megascops albogularis (Cassin, 1849)

Synonyms
- Otus albogularis

= White-throated screech owl =

Species of owl

The white-throated screech owl (Megascops albogularis) is a small owl found in the Andes of Bolivia, Colombia, Ecuador, Peru and Venezuela.

== Taxonomy and systematics ==
The white-throated screech owl was described by the American ornithologist John Cassin in 1849 and given the binomial name Syrnium albo-gularis. Five subspecies are currently recognized:

- M. a. obscurus Phelps & Phelps Jr. (1953)
- M. a. meridensis Chapman (1923)
- M. a. macabrus Bonaparte (1850)
- M. a. albogularis Cassin (1849)
- M. a. remotus Bond & Meyer de Schauensee (1941)

However, its taxonomy is not certain. The species has sometimes been placed in the monotypic genus Macabra, but DNA studies show it is closely related to several other Megascops owls. At the subspecies level, M. a. obscurus is sometimes considered a color morph of M. a. meridensis or M. a. remotus. The population of rufescent screech owl (Megascops ingens) in eastern Ecuador has sometimes been considered to be another subspecies of white-throated screech owl (M. a. aequatorialis) or be part of the nominate M. a. albogularis.

== Description ==
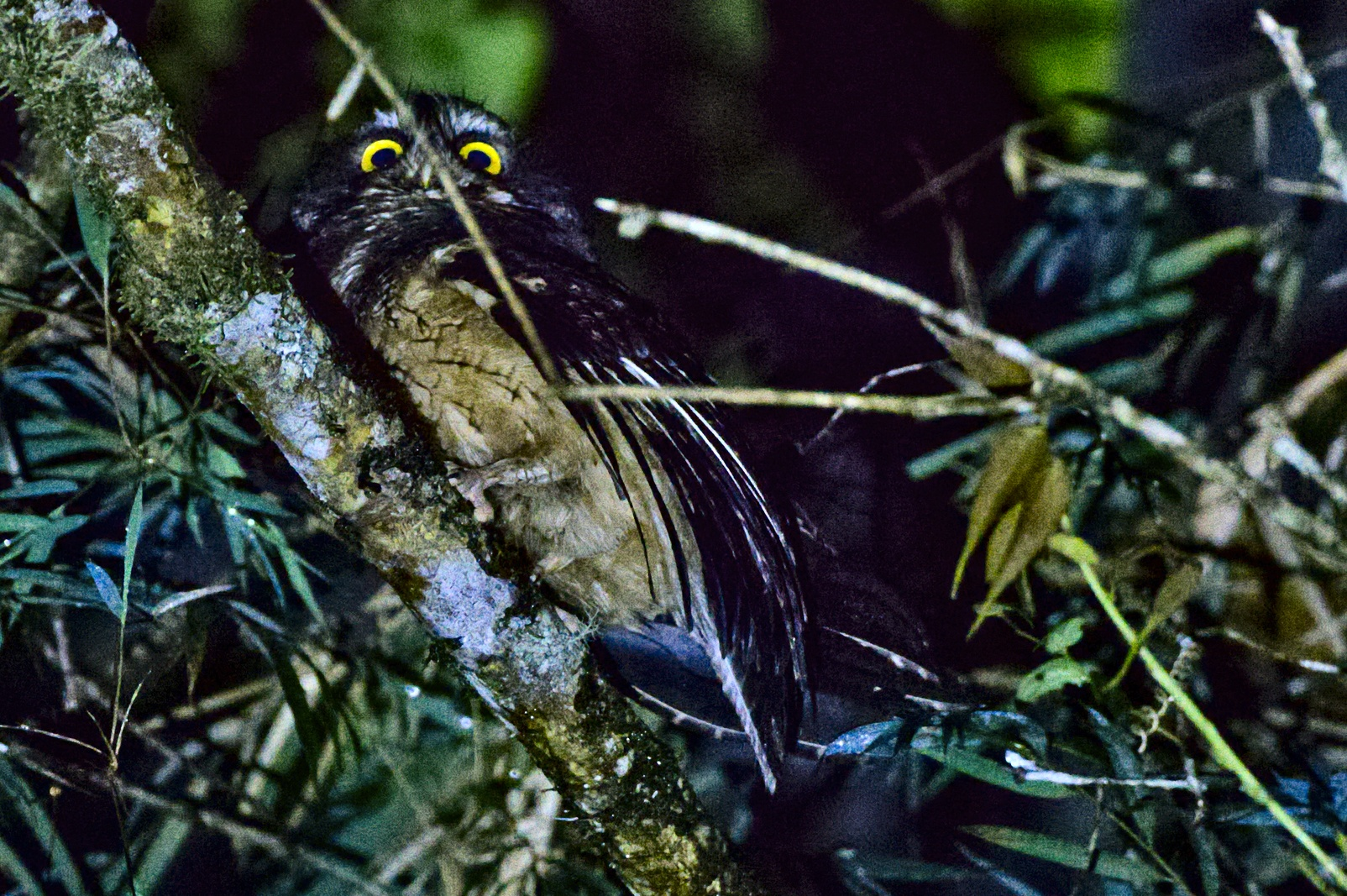
White-throated screech owl

The white-throated screech owl is a large member of its genus. It is 20 to 26 cm (7.9 to 10.2 in) long and weighs 130 to 185 g (4.6 to 6.5 oz). It is overall dark plumaged, has a round head with very small ear tufts, and a longish tail. Adults of the nominate subspecies have a dark brown head and upperparts with small blackish, reddish, and white marks. Their flight feathers and tail have narrow darker bars. They have a dark facial disc with whitish marks above and below the orange eyes and a large white area below the bill that in some postures looks like large moustaches. Their chest is dark brown with tawny spots and their belly is tawny with dusky bars and streaks. The juvenile is pale buffy gray and has a black "mask" and barring on its crown, mantle, and underparts.

M. a. meridensis has a whitish forehead and eyebrows, a suggestion of a nuchal collar, and a paler belly than the nominate. M. a. macabrus is similar to the nominate but with finer markings on the underparts. M. a. obscurus and M. a. remotus are darker than the nominate, blackish above with few lighter spots, a dark breast, and only faint bars and streaks on the belly.

== Distribution and habitat ==
The subspecies of the white-throated screech owl are found thus:

- M. a. obscurus, Serranía del Perijá on the northern Colombia/northwestern Venezuela border
- M. a. meridensis, Andes of western Venezuela
- M. a. macabrus, Colombia's Central and Western Andes south through Ecuador into Peru's Department of Cajamarca
- M. a. albogularis, eastern Andes of Colombia and Ecuador
- M. a. remotus, eastern Andes of Peru south to central Bolivia's Cochabamba Department

The white-throated screech owl inhabits the interior and edges of open humid evergreen montane forest and cloud forest and semi-open areas of scattered trees. In elevation it usually ranges between 2,000 and 3,000 m (6,600 and 9,800 ft) but is found locally as low as 1,300 m (4,300 ft) and, on the east slope of the Peruvian Andes, as high as 3,700 m (12,100 ft).

== Behavior ==
=== Feeding ===
The white-throated screech owl is nocturnal. It forages in the forest canopy, mostly for insects and other arthropods and perhaps small vertebrates as well.

=== Breeding ===
Information about the white-throated screech owl's breeding phenology is scarce. Unlike most other members of genus Megascops, which nest in cavities, it has been reported to nest on the ground or in an old cup nest of another species.

=== Vocalization ===
The white-throated screech owl has several vocalizations. What is believed to be its primary male song is "gruff, barked notes, 'churrochurro-churro-chu chu chu chu'" given for up to a minute. A secondary song is "evenly spaced hoots, [about] 5 per second". Members of a pair sing in duet, with the female having a higher pitch. The female also has various agitation calls.

== Status ==
The IUCN has assessed the white-throated screech owl as being of Least Concern. Its population number is not known but it is believed to be stable.

== Multimedia ==
- https://search.macaulaylibrary.org/catalog?taxonCode=whtsco1 Photographs and audio recordings
