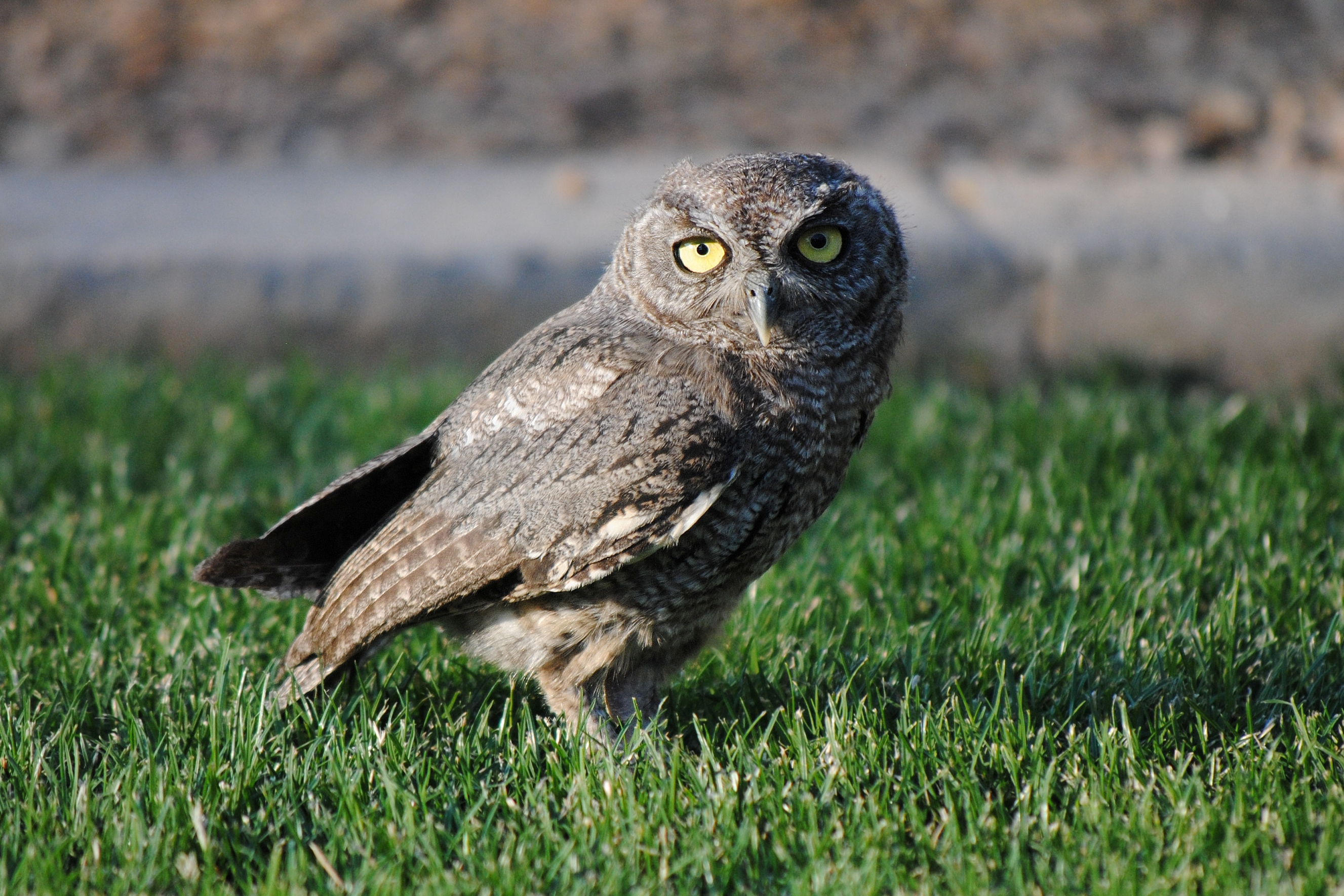

Conservation status
- Least Concern (IUCN 3.1)
- CITES Appendix II

Scientific classification
- Kingdom: Animalia
- Phylum: Chordata
- Class: Aves
- Order: Strigiformes
- Family: Strigidae
- Genus: Megascops
- Species: M. kennicottii

Binomial name
- Megascops kennicottii (Elliot, 1867)

Subspecies
- See text

Synonyms
- Otus kennicottii

= Western screech owl =

Species of owl

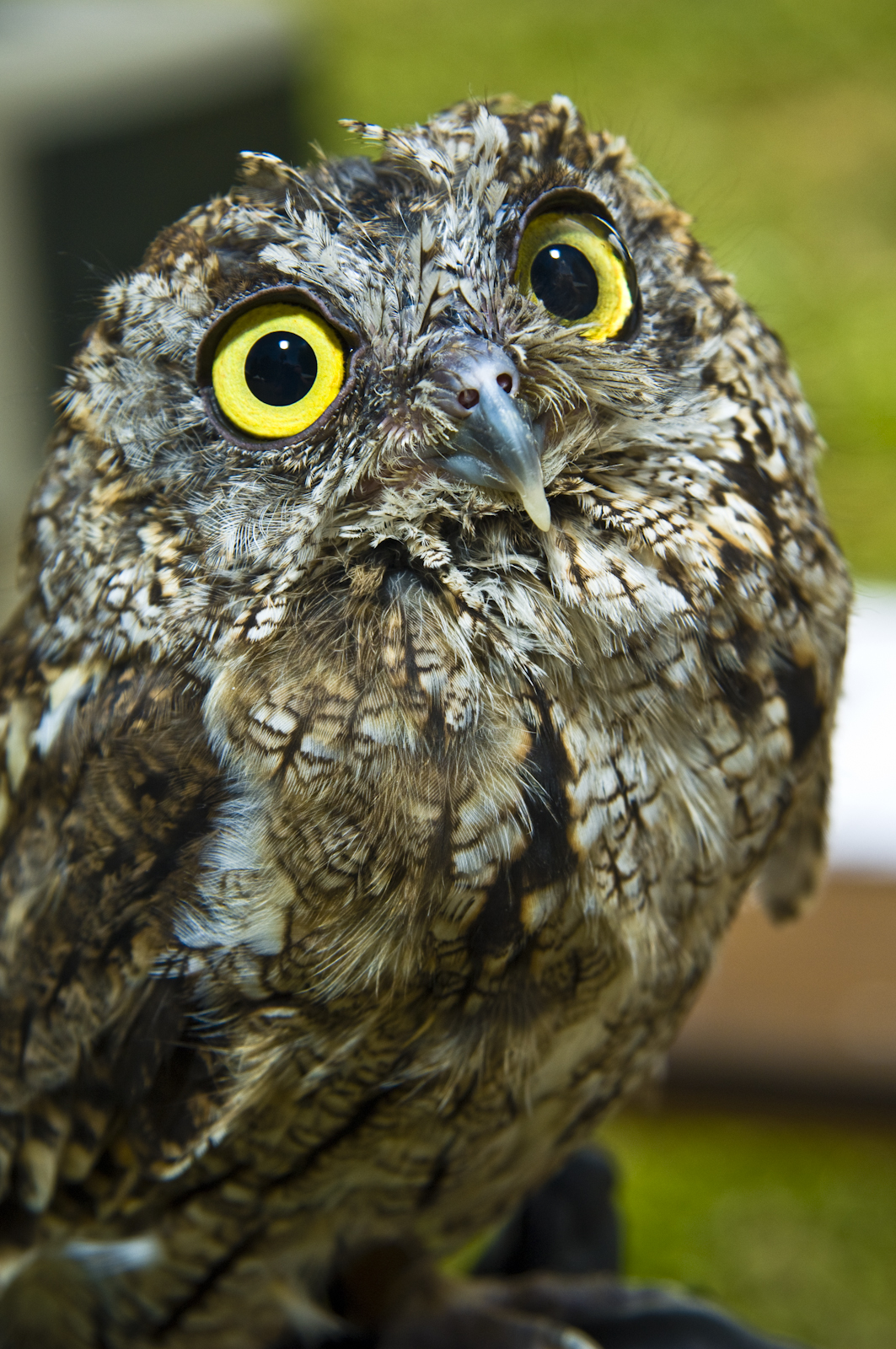
Western screech owl in the Pacific Northwest

The western screech owl (Megascops kennicottii) is a small owl native to North and Central America, closely related to the eastern screech owl. The scientific name commemorates the American naturalist Robert Kennicott and roughly translates to "Kennicott's great/large owl".

== Description ==
Length averages 22 cm (8.7 in), wingspan 55 cm (22 in), and weight 143 g (5.0 oz). Weight ranges from 88 to 220 g (3.1 to 7.8 oz). Females are larger than males and northern populations are notably larger than southern populations. Adults are larger than whiskered screech owls, with larger feet and a more streaked plumage pattern.

There are several morphs: brown Pacific, grey Pacific, Great Plains, Mojave, and Mexican. All have either brown or dark gray plumage with streaking on the underparts. There is no red morph. This brown and gray streaky coloring allows the owl to camouflage with trees and hide from predators.

They have a round head with ear tufts, yellow eyes, and a yellowish bill. Their appearance is quite similar to whiskered and eastern screech owls, so it is best to identify them by their calls. They were previously considered to be the same species as the eastern screech owl.

== Call ==
The primary call is an accelerating series of short whistles at an increasing tempo or a short then long trill falling slightly at end. Other calls: barking and chuckling, similar to the eastern screech owl. They also make a high pitched screech.

The two primary songs for the Western Screech Owl are the bounce and double trill. In a recent study, researchers utilizes sonographic analysis of tape-recorded vocalizations to analyze whether the songs differ in male and females and if so, how accurately could songs be classified by sex. It was discovered that on average, male bounce songs were ~30% lower in frequency than bounce songs of females. However, song duration, note duration, number of notes per bout, and internote duration did not differ. For trill songs, males were also significantly lower in frequency compared to those of females. In addition, female double trill songs had greater internote distances in the leading portion.

== Range and habitat ==
The western screech owl is native to Canada, United States, Mexico, Guatemala, El Salvador, Honduras, Costa Rica, and Nicaragua. Its habitat includes temperate forests, subtropical and tropical montane forests, shrubland, desert, rural fields, and even suburban parks and gardens.

== Breeding ==
Western screech owls are permanent residents of the northwest region of North and Central America, breeding in open woods or mixed woods at forest edges. When attracting a female, a male brings her food and creates a series of clicking noises. During courtship, the pair preens each other's feathers and sing duets with each other. Once a male and female become a pair, they produce a clutch of 2–7 eggs. The male delivers food to the female as she broods, and once the eggs hatch, the male continues to provide food which the female feeds to the owlets. Both mates then protect their owlets by guarding their tree cavity from dangers such as snakes, jays, and crows. The female is inseparable from her young for their first three weeks of life, but afterwards she joins the male in hunting for two weeks until the baby owls are ready to leave the nest. Once leaving the nest, the chicks will stay together in nearby sheltered areas and beg for food from the parents. At about five weeks, the chicks will become better at catching their own food.

== Nesting ==

Rather than living in traditional nests, Western Screech Owls reside in cavities in trees, banks, or cliffs. Of these cavities, the tree species vary. They include, but are not limited to oaks, willows, cottonwoods, and cacti. These cavities are around 1 foot in diameter and up to 1.5 feet deep.

More often than not, these cavities are found by the male owl and were made by natural causes or other species such as woodpeckers. They could nest in these cavities for several years.

The cavities serve not only as shelter, but also as a camouflaging device against potential predators. The height for these nests range from approximately 10 to 30 feet above ground.

== Hunting and prey ==
These nocturnal birds wait on perches to swoop down on unsuspecting prey; they may also catch insects in flight. They are active at dawn, night, or near dusk, using their excellent hearing and night vision to locate prey. Their diet consists mainly of small mammals (such as mice, rats, flying squirrels, bats, there is even a photo of a male bringing in an American Pika to a nest in western Montana), birds (such as northern cardinals, white-throated sparrows, Pine Siskins, and American Robins), and large insects (such as cicadas or in some areas stoneflies); however they are opportunistic predators, even taking to small trout, annelid worms, scorpions, crayfish, reptiles, amphibians, and smaller birds. Their diet varies based on the season and where exactly they reside.

Motion-activated cameras have photographed the birds eagerly scavenging a road-kill opossum. They have also been known to hunt mallard ducks and cottontail rabbits, occasionally. Hatching of their young is synchronized with the spring migration of birds; after migrants pass through screech-owls take fledglings of local birds.

== Conservation status ==
Although the western screech owl is slowly declining in the Pacific Northwest, the species is considered "of low conservation concern" due to their nocturnality and general ability to live alongside humans in surrounding trees. Their population is estimated to be 180,000 according to the Avian Conservation Assessment Database Scores. In areas densely populated by people, human noise can be a disturbance to their creation of nest cavities and human devastation of forests negatively affects their habitat. Climate disasters such as fires and heat waves can endanger their livelihood. Humans have made efforts to provide manmade shelter, such as nest boxes, for western screech owls. The owls have proven to be receptive to these habitats.

== Subspecies ==
There are 9 recognized subspecies:

- Megascops kennicottii aikeni Brewster, 1891
- Megascops kennicottii bendirei (Brewster, 1882)
- Megascops kennicottii cardonensis (Huey, 1926)
- Megascops kennicottii kennicottii (Elliot, 1867)
- Megascops kennicottii macfarlanei Brewster, 1891
- Megascops kennicottii suttoni (R. T. Moore, 1941)
- Megascops kennicottii vinaceus Brewster, 1888
- Megascops kennicottii xantusi Brewster, 1902
- Megascops kennicottii yumanensis (A. H. Miller & L. Miller, 1951)

== Gallery ==
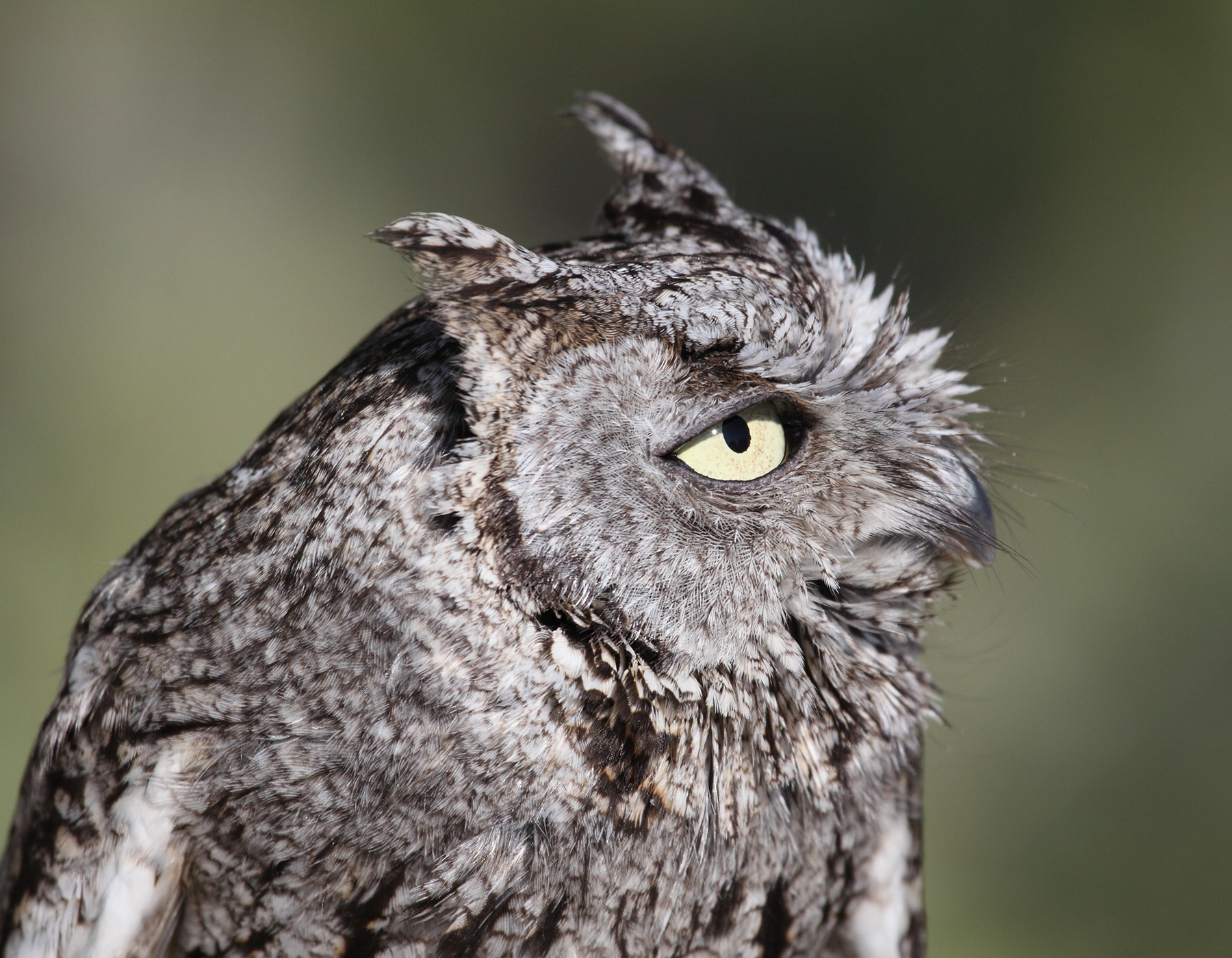
Captive bird at the Desert Museum

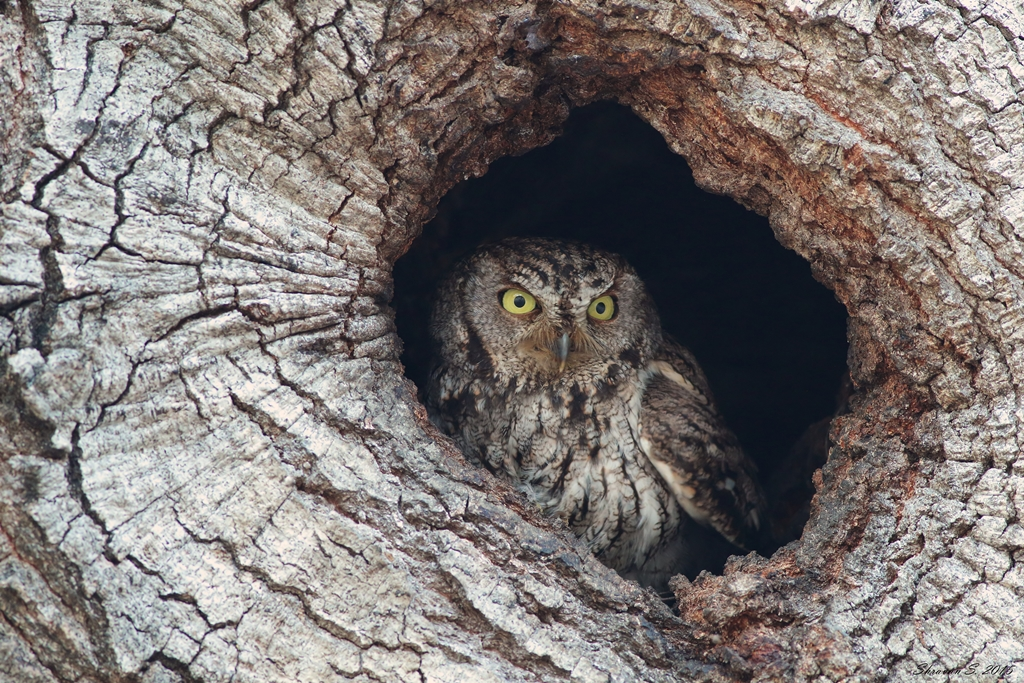
Nest hole

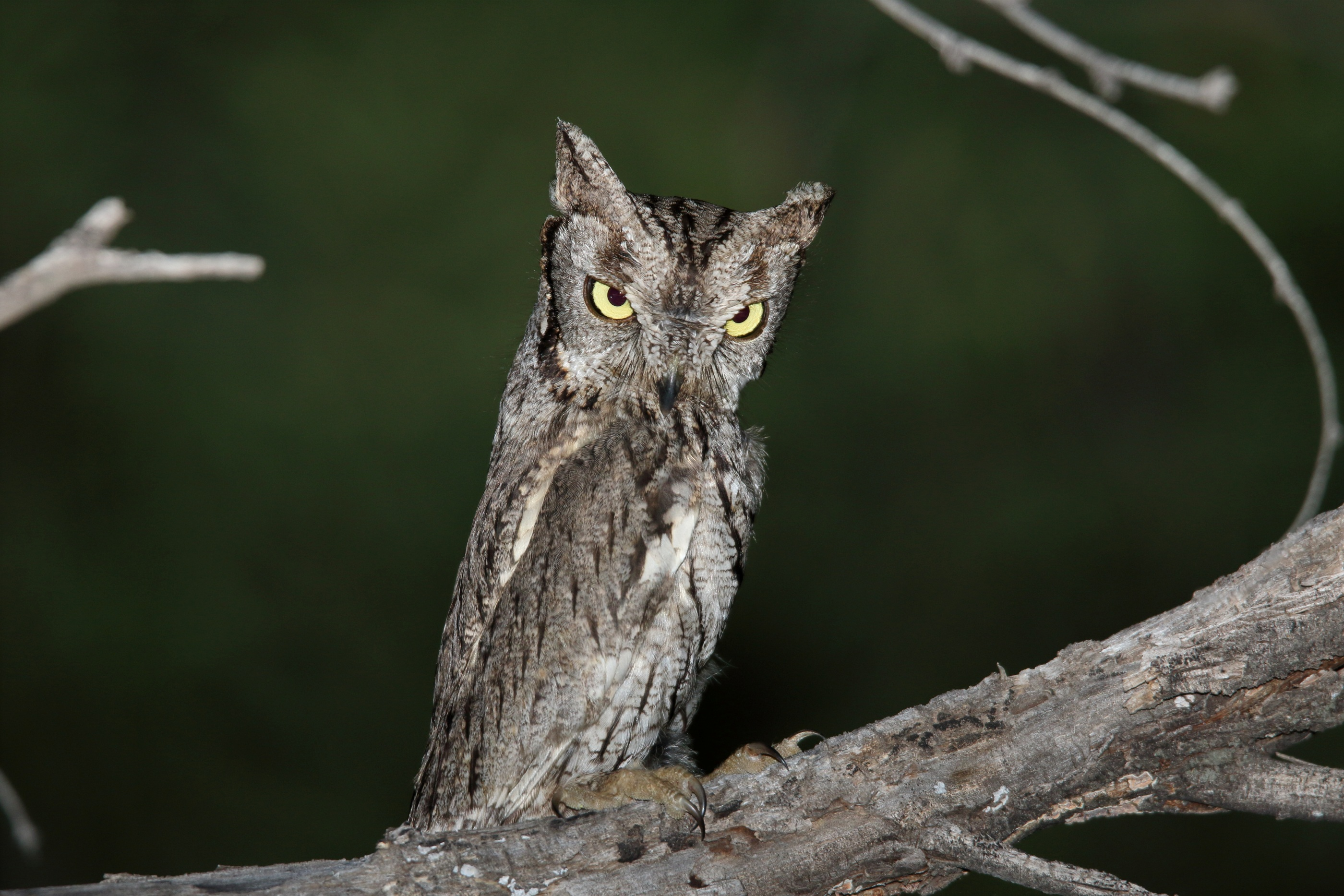
Perched
