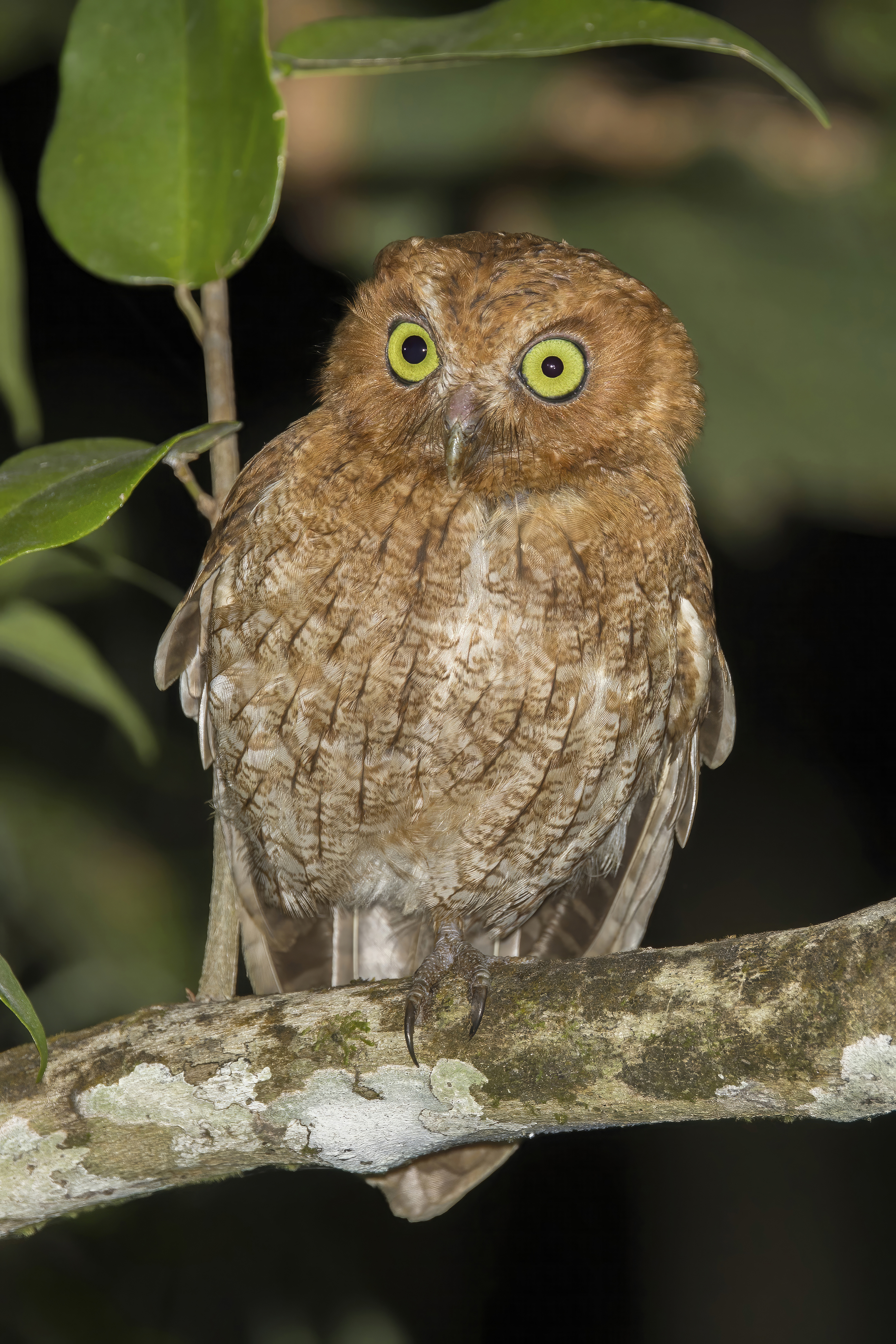
- M. g. guatemalae, Belize

Conservation status
- Least Concern (IUCN 3.1)

Scientific classification
- Kingdom: Animalia
- Phylum: Chordata
- Class: Aves
- Order: Strigiformes
- Family: Strigidae
- Genus: Megascops
- Species: M. guatemalae

Binomial name
- Megascops guatemalae (Sharpe, 1875)

Synonyms
- Otus guatemalae (Sharpe, 1875)

= Middle American screech owl =

Species of owl

The Middle American screech owl (Megascops guatemalae), also known as the Guatemalan screech owl or the vermiculated screech owl, is a species of owl in the family Strigidae. It is found from northern Mexico to western Panama.

== Taxonomy and systematics ==
The taxonomy of the Middle American screech owl is somewhat unsettled. The International Ornithological Committee (IOC) recognizes these six subspecies, but notes that fuscus and dacrysistactus might not be distinct enough to warrant subspecies status.

- M. g. hastatus Ridgway (1887)
- M. g. cassini Ridgway (1878)
- M. g. fuscus Moore & Peters (1939)
- M. g. guatemalae Sharpe (1875)
- M. g. dacrysistactus Moore & Peters (1939)
- M. g. vermiculatus Ridgway (1887)

Until July 2023 the IOC treated vermiculatus as a separate species, the vermiculated screech owl; the North American Classification Committee of the American Ornithological Society (AOS/NACC) and the Clements taxonomy had included it earlier. BirdLife International's Handbook of the Birds of the World (HBW) retains vermiculatus as the separate vermiculated screech owl.

The AOS/NACC and Clements add another subspecies, M. g. thompsoni, which the IOC includes within the nominate M. g. guatemalae.

== Description ==
The Middle American screech owl is 20 to 23 cm (7.9 to 9.1 in) long and weighs 95 to 150 g (3.4 to 5.3 oz). It is dimorphic, with one morph overall grayish-brown and the other overall rufous. Unlike other owls of the same genus, it has feathered feet. The brown morph has a light brown facial disc with a thin dark border, thin white brows over yellow eyes, and short dark "ear" tufts. Its crown and upperparts range from dark gray brown to blackish brown; the crown has blackish spots and bars and the back has darker streaks and vermiculations. The fairly long tail is barred. The underparts are paler with conspicuous longitudinal stripes and some horizontal stripes. The beak is greenish. The rufous morph is overall reddish and the various streaks and stripes are less distinct. The various subspecies are similar, differing mainly in size (which increases north to south) and the intensity of the colors.

== Distribution and habitat ==
The six subspecies of Middle American screech owl recognized by the IOC are found thus:

- M. g. hastatus, western Mexico from Sonora and Chihuahua south to Sinaloa and Oaxaca
- M. g. cassini, eastern Mexico from Tamaulipas south to northern Veracruz
- M. g. fuscus, central Veracruz
- M. g. guatemalae, from southeastern Veracruz and northeastern Oaxaca (including the Yucatán Peninsula and Cozumel Island) south through Belize and Guatemala into Honduras
- M. g. dacrysistactus, northern Nicaragua
- M. g. vermiculatus, extreme eastern Nicaragua through Costa Rica into western Panama

The Yucatán and Cozumel populations of guatemalae are treated as M. g. thompsoni by the AOS/NACC and Clements.

The Middle American screech owl inhabits several types of humid to semi-arid landscapes including evergreen, semi-deciduous, and thorn forest, and to a lesser extent secondary forest and plantations. In elevation it ranges from sea level to 1,500 m (4,900 ft).

== Behavior ==
=== Feeding ===
The Middle American screech owl is nocturnal; it hunts mostly by swooping on prey from a perch and also by catching it in flight. Its diet is mostly large insects but sometimes includes small vertebrates.

=== Breeding ===
Little is known about the Middle American screech owl's breeding biology. It apparently nests mostly in March and April but may extend that into June. The clutch of two or three eggs is laid in a natural tree cavity or abandoned woodpecker hole.

=== Vocalization ===
The Middle American screech owl's principal territorial song is "a rapid, quavering trill...increasing in pitch and volume, [and] ending abruptly". Its secondary song is a "short series of notes...in bouncing-ball rhythm."

== Status ==
The IUCN follows HBW taxonomy and so has separately assessed the Middle American and vermiculated screech owls. Both are assessed as being of Least Concern. The population size of neither is known but both are believed to be decreasing. No immediate threats to either have been identified. The species potentially faces threats from habitat loss.

The Convention on International Trade in Endangered Species of Wild Fauna and Flora (CITES) lists the Middle American screech owl in Appendix II.
