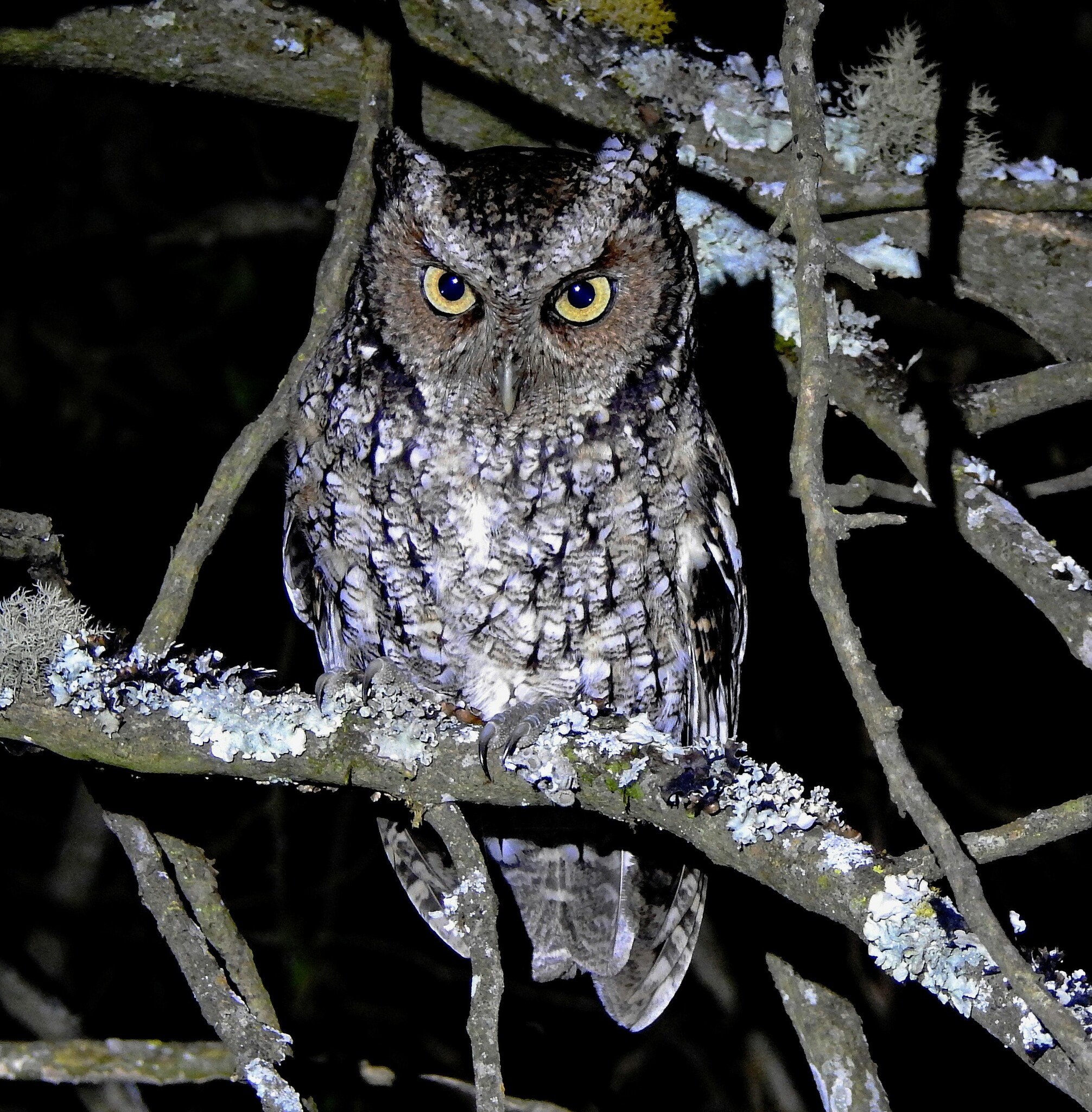

Conservation status
- Least Concern (IUCN 3.1)
- CITES Appendix II (CITES)

Scientific classification
- Kingdom: Animalia
- Phylum: Chordata
- Class: Aves
- Order: Strigiformes
- Family: Strigidae
- Genus: Megascops
- Species: M. hoyi

Binomial name
- Megascops hoyi (König, C & Straneck, 1989)

= Yungas screech owl =

Species of owl

The Yungas screech owl (Megascops hoyi), also known as montane forest screech-owl and Hoy's screech owl, is a species of owl in the family Strigidae. It is found in Argentina and Bolivia.

== Taxonomy and systematics ==
The Yungas screech owl is monotypic. It and the current black-capped screech owl and long-tufted screech owl have sometimes been considered conspecific under the name "long-tufted screech owl" but with the black-capped screech owl's binomial, Megascops atricapilla. However, vocal and DNA evidence refute that treatment. The International Ornithological Committee (IOC) uses the name "Yungas screech owl" but notes that the English name is "unsettled". The South American Classification Committee of the American Ornithological Society (AOS/SACC), the Clements taxonomy, and BirdLife International's Handbook of the Birds of the World use the English name "montane forest screech-owl".

== Description ==
The Yungas screech owl is 23 to 24 cm (9.1 to 9.4 in) long and weighs 110 to 145 g (3.9 to 5.1 oz). It occurs in brown, gray, and rufous morphs. It has a gray-brown facial disc, white brows over bright yellow eyes, and small "ear" tufts. Its upperparts are overall brown, gray-tinged in the gray morph and rusty in the rufous morph. The upperparts have dark vermiculation and streaks. The closed wing shows a row of large white spots. The tail has light brown stripes and vermiculation. Its underparts are light gray to gray-brown with an ochre wash; the breast and flanks have prominent black streaks.

== Distribution and habitat ==
The Yungas screech owl is found from south-central Bolivia's Cochabamba Department south into northwestern Argentina as far as Tucumán Province and possibly further to Catamarca Province. It inhabits moist montane forest and cloud forest characterized by tall trees and epiphytes. In elevation it generally ranges from 1,000 to 2,600 m (3,300 to 8,500 ft) but locally is found as high as 2,800 m (9,200 ft). Though the species is mostly sedentary, birds nesting in the higher elevations are thought to move lower in winter.

== Behavior ==
=== Feeding ===
The Yungas screech owl forages on and near the ground, along forest edges, and in the forest's upper canopy. Its diet is thought to be mostly insects and spiders but some small vertebrates are also taken.

=== Breeding ===
The Yungas screech owl probably lays its eggs at the beginning of the rainy season, in September and October. It appears to nest mostly in tree cavities such as old woodpecker holes.

=== Vocalization ===
Pairs of Yungas screech owls duet, a primary song that "begins softly, gradually swells into [a] rapid staccato of 'u' notes, and tapers off at [the] end." The female's voice is higher pitched. A secondary song is similar but shorter.

== Status ==
The IUCN has assessed the Yungas screech owl as being of Least Concern. It is "not uncommon locally" and "is to some extent protected by the inaccessibility of parts of its range."
