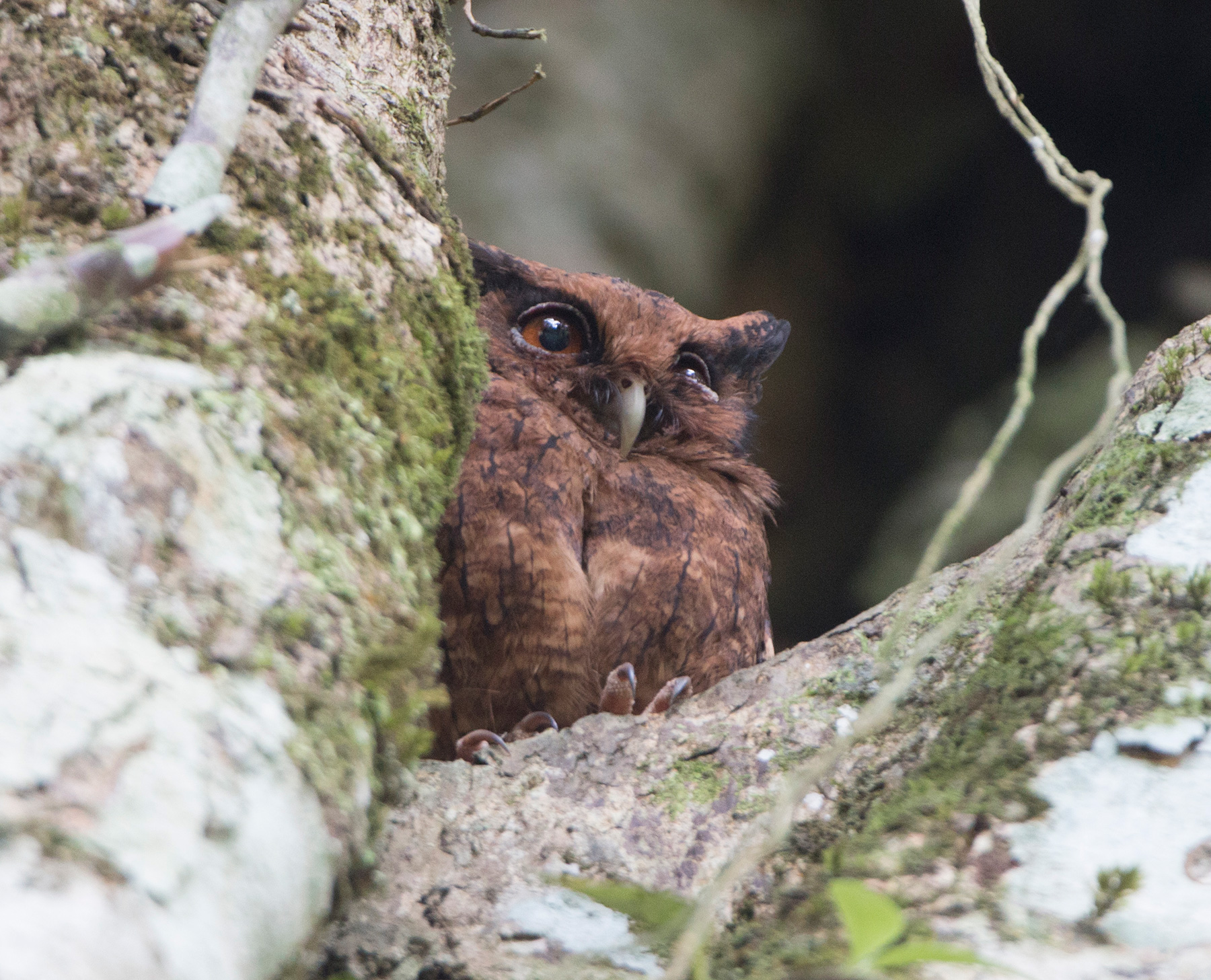

Conservation status
- Least Concern (IUCN 3.1)
- CITES Appendix II

Scientific classification
- Kingdom: Animalia
- Phylum: Chordata
- Class: Aves
- Order: Strigiformes
- Family: Strigidae
- Genus: Megascops
- Species: M. watsonii

Binomial name
- Megascops watsonii (Cassin, 1849)

Synonyms
- Otus watsonii

= Tawny-bellied screech owl =

Species of owl

The tawny-bellied screech owl (Megascops watsonii) is a species of owl in the family Strigidae. It is found in Bolivia, Brazil, Colombia, Ecuador, French Guiana, Guyana, Peru, Suriname, and Venezuela.

== Taxonomy and systematics ==
The tawny-bellied screech owl was described by the American ornithologist John Cassin in 1849 and given the binomial name Ephialtes watsonii. It was later placed in genus Otus and later still the New World members of that genus were transferred to Megascops.

The tawny-bellied screech owl is part of a complex of species that includes the Santa Marta screech owl (M. gilesi), West Peruvian screech owl (M. roboratus), black-capped screech owl (M. atricapilla), and perhaps other undescribed species. Two subspecies are recognized, the nominate M. w. watsonii and M. w. usta. The latter has been suggested as a species in its own right.

== Description ==
The tawny-bellied screech owl is 19 to 24 cm (7.5 to 9.4 in) long. The nominate subspecies weighs 114 to 155 g (4.0 to 5.5 oz) and M. w. usta 115 to 141 g (4.1 to 5.0 oz). The nominate has a dark buff facial disc with a thin darker border, dark buff brows over dark yellow eyes, and longish broad "ear" tufts. The crown and upperparts are dark gray-brown with black and buff spots and vermiculations. The tail has alternating brown and light buff bars. The breast is dark brown with small buff spots. The rest of the underparts are buff with black streaks and the belly also has faint white bars. M. w. usta has a similar pattern but is rufous overall and the underparts' streaks are broader. Its eyes are warm brown. It also occurs in brown and buff morphs.

== Distribution and habitat ==
The nominate subspecies of tawny-bellied screech owl is found north of the Amazon River from eastern Colombia east through Venezuela and the Guianas and south through Ecuador into northeastern Peru and Amazonian Brazil. M. w. usta is found south of the Amazon in eastern Peru, northern Bolivia, and southern Amazonian Brazil to northern Mato Grosso.

The tawny-bellied screech owl inhabits the interior of lowland rainforest, mostly old growth and mature secondary forest. M. w. usta can also be found in altered forest along waterways and near human settlements. The species tends to favor undergrowth to the mid-story below 30 m (98 ft) high. It is seldom found above elevations of 600 to 700 m (2,000 to 2,300 ft) above sea level.

== Behavior ==
=== Feeding ===
Little is known about the tawny-bellied screech owl's feeding habits. It is nocturnal, forages at lower levels of the forest, and is believed to feed mostly on insects but possibly small vertebrates as well.

=== Breeding ===
Almost nothing is known about the tawny-bellied screech owl's breeding phenology. A nest was documented in September a hole in a dead palm; it contained a very young chick. Another nest held two eggs.

=== Vocalization ===
The nominate tawny-bellied screech owl's primary song is "a long series of rapid notes, becoming faster and louder, then fading with [a] low trill." That of M. w. usta is similar but slower. The nominate's secondary song is a "brief series of short 'wu' notes"; that of M. w. usta is "thought to be fast series of 'bu' notes, slowing to [a] 'bouncing' rhythm".

== Status ==
The IUCN has assessed the tawny-bellied screech owl as being of Least Concern. Though it appears to be fairly common and widespread, it is poorly known, and because it requires mature forest, "the major threat to its survival must surely be destruction of its habitat."
