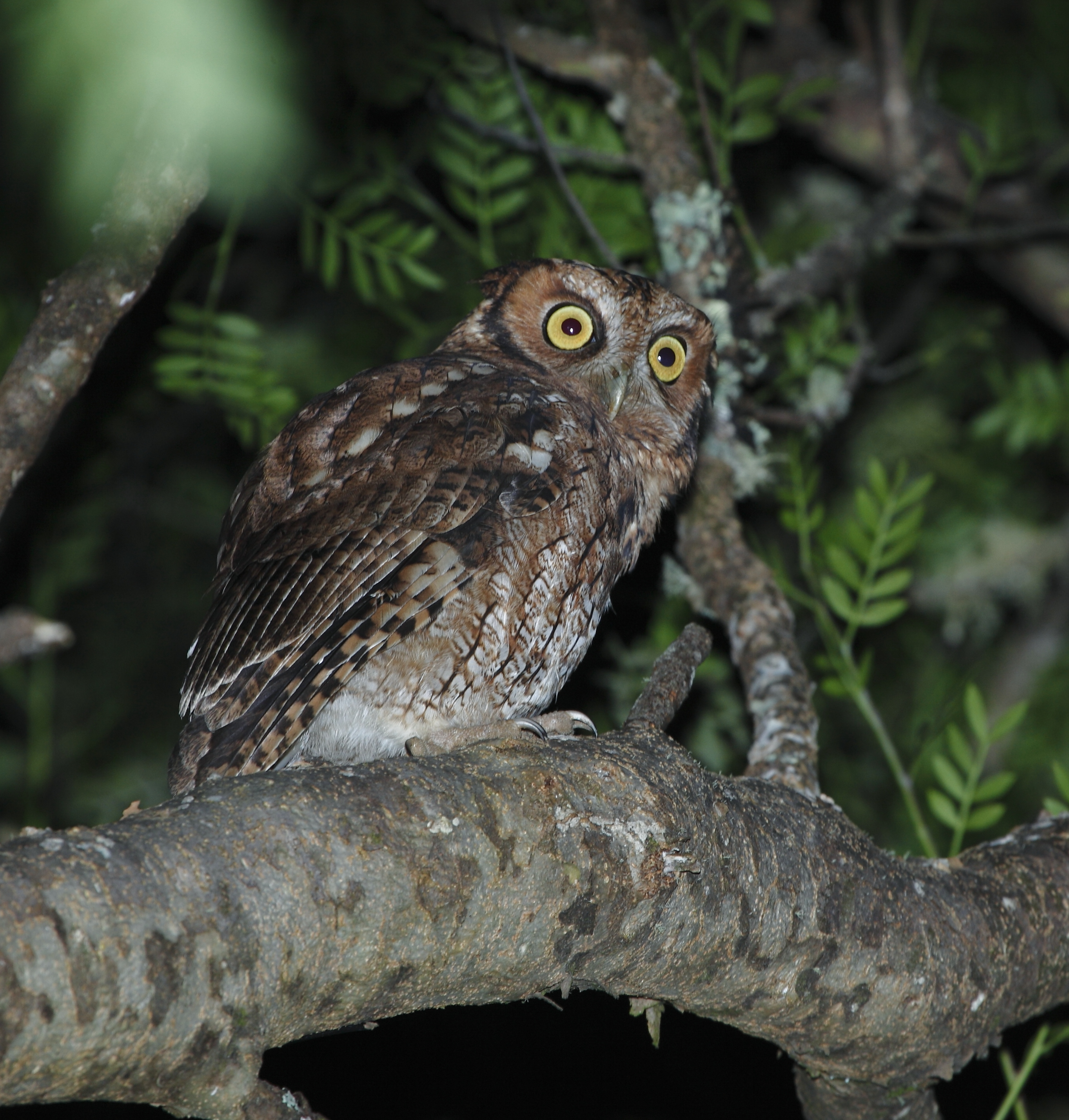
- Long-tufted screech owl at Urupema, Santa Catarina (state), Brazil

Conservation status
- Least Concern (IUCN 3.1)
- CITES Appendix II (CITES)

Scientific classification
- Kingdom: Animalia
- Phylum: Chordata
- Class: Aves
- Order: Strigiformes
- Family: Strigidae
- Genus: Megascops
- Species: M. sanctaecatarinae

Binomial name
- Megascops sanctaecatarinae (Salvin, 1897)

Synonyms
- Otus sanctaecatarinae Sibley and Monroe, 1990, 1993; Ephialtes argentina Schlegel, 1862 (disputed name); Otus atricapillus argentinus Hekstra, 1982 (disputed name); Otus choliba maximus Sztolcman, 1926; Otus choliba pintoi Kelso, 1936 (disputed name)

= Long-tufted screech owl =

Species of owl

The long-tufted screech owl (Megascops sanctaecatarinae) is a species of "typical owl" in the subfamily Striginae. It is found in Argentina, Brazil, and Uruguay.

== Taxonomy and systematics ==
The long-tufted screech owl has had a tortuous taxonomic history. What is currently (2022) accepted as the species' original description was by Osbert Salvin in 1897; he assigned it the binomial Scops sanctae-catarinae. Genus Scops was lumped into Otus in the early 20th century but in the early 21st century the current Megascops was adopted for what are now 23 species of screech owls.

The long-tufted screech owl was at different times treated as a subspecies or a synonym of what is now the black-capped screech owl (Megascops atricapilla). Other authors considered it, the Yungas screech owl (M. hoyi), and what is now the Middle American screech owl (M. guatemalae) all to be conspecific with M. atricapilla. Since then, morphological, vocal, and genetic analyses have determined that they are not only separate species but also not closely related to each other.

Other complications arise because the several populations of genus Megascops found in southern Brazil and Argentina's Misiones Province have not been studied enough to be certain that they are correctly assigned. In addition, the specific epithet argentinus that has been wrongly applied to the southernmost population of M. atricapilla might prove to be the correct epithet for long-tufted screech owl because of the principle of priority. It had been assigned to a specimen that predates Salvin's description and that might be a long-tufted screech owl.

The long-tufted screech owl is monotypic.

== Description ==
The long-tufted screech owl is 25 to 28 cm (9.8 to 11 in) long. Males weigh 155 to 194 g (5.5 to 6.8 oz) and females 174 to 211 g (6.1 to 7.4 oz). It is a fairly large and bulky member of Megascops, with stronger feet than most others. It occurs in three color morphs of which the brown one predominates over the gray and rufous. It has very prominent "ear" tufts. The upperparts of the common morph's adult are dark brown with pale, coarse, indistinct vermiculation; its crown is somewhat lighter. The brown facial disc has a darker border. The underparts are a mix of irregular bars, streaks, and vermiculation in shades of brown. The eye is pale yellow to orange-yellow, the bill greenish gray, and the feet pale grayish brown. The plumages of the gray and rufous morphs and the juvenile have not been formally described.

== Distribution and habitat ==
The long-tufted screech owl is found in the southeastern Brazilian states of Paraná, Santa Catarina, and Rio Grande do Sul, in Misiones Province of northeastern Argentina, and in adjoining northern Uruguay. It inhabits a variety of open and semi-open landscapes. Examples include sparse woodland, pastures with trees, the edges (but not interior) of dense forest, secondary forest, and woodlots near villages. In elevation it mainly occurs between 300 and 1,000 m (980 and 3,300 ft).

== Behavior ==
=== Movement ===
The long-tufted screech owl is believed to be a year-round resident throughout its range.

=== Feeding ===
The long-tufted screech owl is primarily nocturnal. It reportedly hunts by dropping from a perch onto prey. Its diet includes arthropods and small vertebrates; rodents, birds, amphibians, and fish are known among the latter.

=== Breeding ===
The long-tufted screech owl's breeding season is not well defined but apparently includes August and September. It nests in tree cavities, either natural or made by woodpeckers. The few known nests fledged one or two young, and the female alone apparently incubates the eggs. Almost nothing else is known about the species' breeding phenology.

=== Vocalization ===
The male long-tufted screech owl's primary song is "a guttural, fast trill...lasting from c. 5–10 seconds and ending suddenly". The female's is similar but shorter and higher pitched. The male's secondary song is "short fast notes that become longer and more spaced, in reversed bouncing-ball rhythm". The female's is very different, a "loud, hoarse, extraordinary, 'bababa...'" that is unique among screech owls.

== Status ==
The IUCN has assessed the long-tufted screech owl as being of Least Concern. It has a fairly large range, but its population size is not known and is believed to be decreasing. "Loss of habitat through overgrazing, burning and tree-felling represents [the] greatest threat to [the] species."
