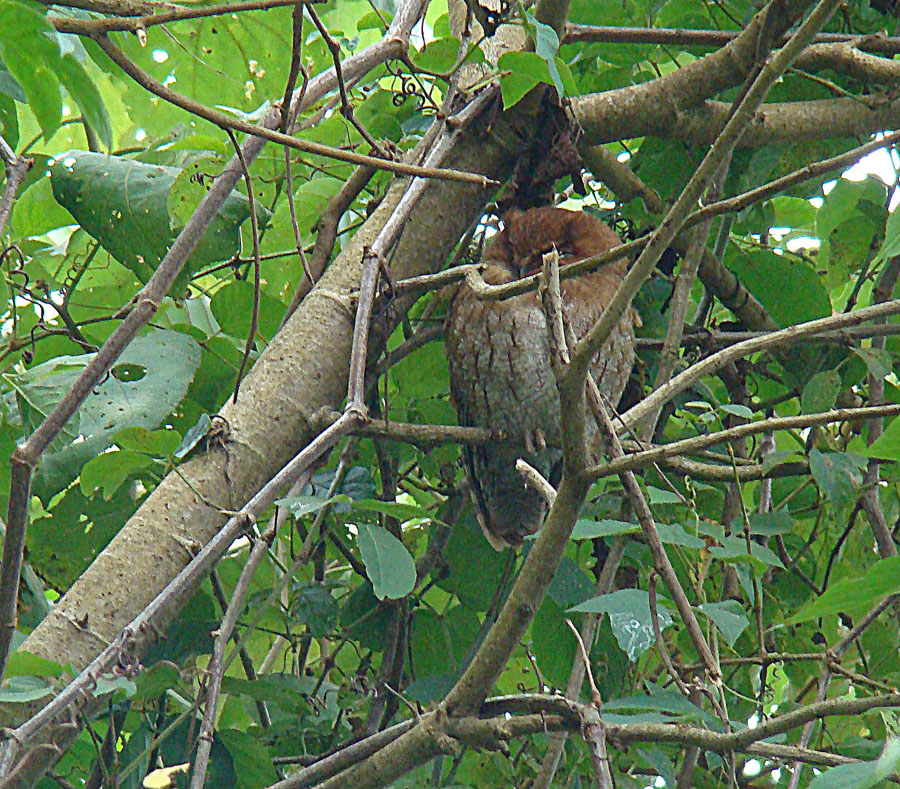

Conservation status
- Vulnerable (IUCN 3.1)
- CITES Appendix II (CITES)

Scientific classification
- Kingdom: Animalia
- Phylum: Chordata
- Class: Aves
- Order: Strigiformes
- Family: Strigidae
- Genus: Megascops
- Species: M. gilesi

Binomial name
- Megascops gilesi Krabbe, 2017

= Santa Marta screech owl =

Species of owl

The Santa Marta screech owl (Megascops gilesi) is a species of owl in the family Strigidae. It is found only in the Sierra Nevada de Santa Marta of Colombia.

== Taxonomy and systematics ==
The Santa Marta screech owl was formally described in 2017, though a specimen collected in 1919 was thought at the time to perhaps be a "distinct form". Relatively recent sightings of individuals that have been retroactively assigned to the species predate 2017. It is thought to be most closely related to West Peruvian screech owl (M. roboratus), tawny-bellied screech owl (M. watsonii), and black-capped screech owl (M. atricapilla).

== Description ==
The Santa Marta screech owl is a medium-sized member of genus Megascops, though the length and mass of the 1919 specimen were not published. The plumage is similar to that of others of its genus, having a reddish to grayish-brown head, back, chest, and wings and a pale belly. The crown and back are barred, the chest has darker brown streaks, and the belly has pale brown barring. The tarsi have golden-buff feathers.

== Distribution and habitat ==
The Santa Marta screech owl is known only from Sierra Nevada de Santa Marta of northern Colombia. Almost all records are from the San Lorenzo ridge and nearby areas, which have easy access and are regularly visited by bird tour groups. There are a smaller number of eBird reports in the central part of the mountain range. The species is thought to inhabit humid forest from 1,800 to 2,500 m (5,900 to 8,200 ft) but may possibly range higher.

== Behavior and ecology ==
Nothing is known about the species' diet and foraging behavior. The only data relative to breeding is that the type specimen was in breeding condition when collected in March 1919.

== Status ==
The IUCN has classed the Santa Marta screech owl as Vulnerable. The species has a restricted range, being found only in the relatively small Sierra Nevada de Santa Marta. Most of the native forest cover has been replaced by pine and eucalyptus plantations and livestock pastures. The species' estimated population is 2300 to 7500 mature individuals and its suitable habitat and population are believed to be declining.
