= Sound localization in owls =

Ability of owls to locate sounds in 3D space

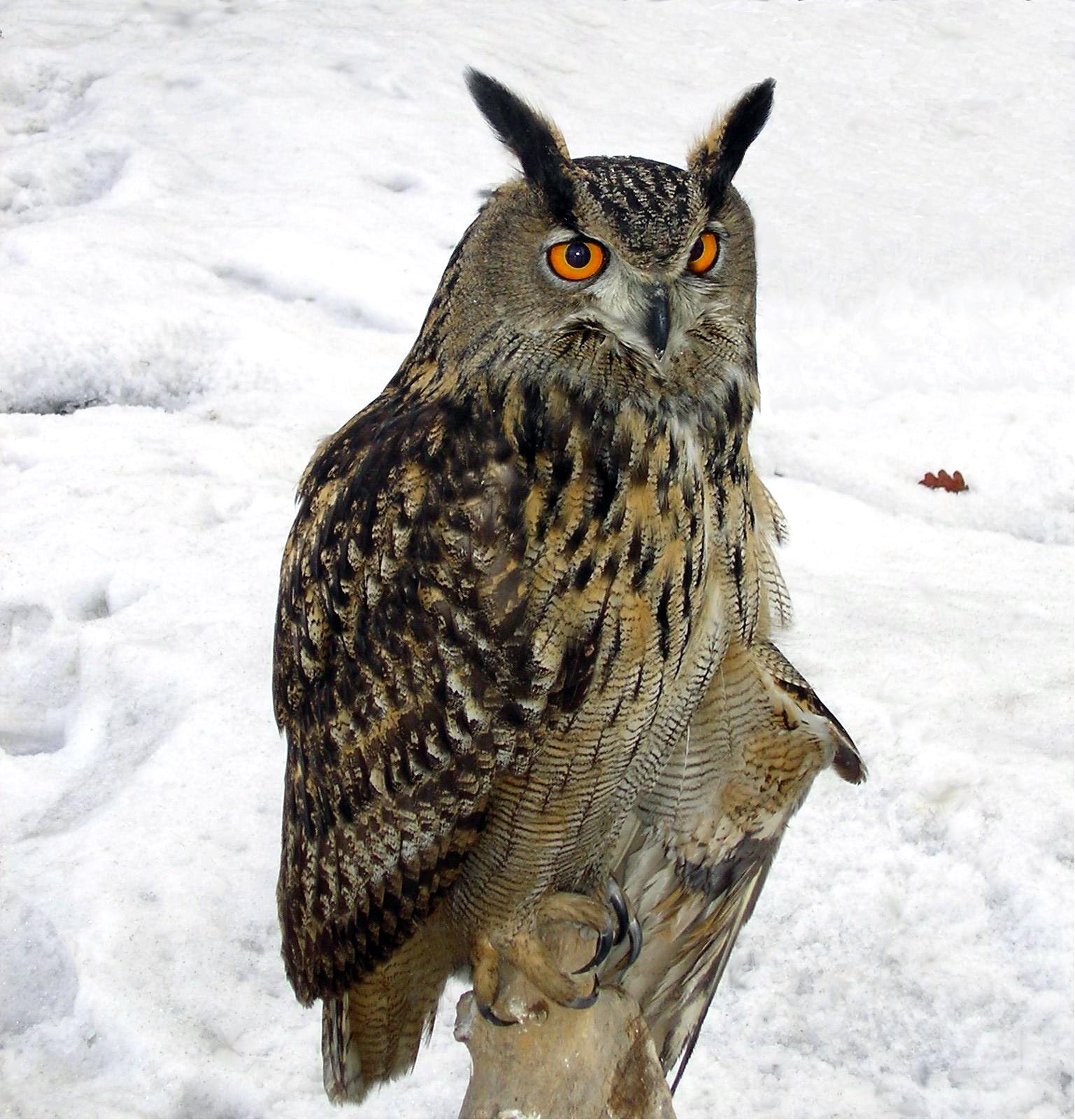
Eurasian eagle-owl in Poland

Most owls are nocturnal or crepuscular birds of prey. Because they hunt at night, they must rely on non-visual senses. Experiments by Roger Payne have shown that owls are sensitive to the sounds made by their prey, not the heat or the smell. In fact, the sound cues are both necessary and sufficient for localization of mice from a distant location where they are perched. For this to work, the owls must be able to accurately localize both the azimuth and the elevation of the sound source.

== Introduction to sound localization ==
Owls are very adept nocturnal predators, hunting prey that includes small mammals, reptiles, and insects. They are able to rotate their head up to 270 degrees, lock onto prey, and launch a silent attack. Owls lock onto prey by using sound localization. Sound localization is an animal's ability to identify the origin of a sound in distance and direction. Several owl species have ears that are asymmetrical in size and location, which enhances this ability. These species include barn owls (Tyto alba), northern saw-whet owls (Aegolius acadicus), and long-eared owls (Asio otus). The barn owl (Tyto alba) is the most commonly studied for sound localization because they use similar methods to humans for interpreting interaural time differences in the horizontal plane. This species has evolved a specialized set of pathways in the brain that allow them to hear a sound and map out the possible location of the object that elicited that sound. Sound waves enter the ear via the ear canal and travel until they reach the tympanic membrane. The tympanic membrane then sends these waves through the ossicles of the middle ear and into the inner ear that includes the vestibular organ, cochlea, and auditory nerve. They are then able to use interaural time difference (ITD) and interaural level difference (ILD) to pinpoint the location and elevation of their prey.

== Anatomy of the ear ==
Owls tend to have asymmetric ears, with the openings being placed just behind the eyes. The shape of the ear opening, known as the aperture, depends on the species. In some species, the opening has a valve, called an operculum, covering it. The left ear opening is typically positioned a bit higher than the right ear opening to aid with sound localization and the detection of prey, even in the dark. During flight, the left ear receives sounds from below them and the right ear receives sounds from above them. The feathers on the edge of barn owl's face creates a disc that works to trap and focus sound, similar to the outer ears of humans. The sound waves travel through the owl's ear canal until they reach the eardrum, through the ossicles, and into the inner ear so that the owl is able to perceive exactly where their prey is located. As owls depend on their ability to track prey using their super sense of hearing in order to survive, it is important to understand the structures of the ear of barn owls that work to transmit these sounds.

The inner ear of barn owls includes the vestibular organ, cochlea, and auditory nerve. The anatomy of the inner ear in barn owls was studied in an experiment where three owls were utilized and fixed at laboratories by the intravascular perfusion of 1% formaldehyde and 1.25% glutaraldehyde in a 0.1 phosphate buffer. The temporal lobes of the owls were then removed from the skulls, post-fixed in 1% osmium tetroxide, dehydrated, then embedded in Araldite to study the anatomy of the inner ear. This study revealed that the basilar papilla of barn owls has two unique features being a proliferation of lenticular cells and a thickening of the basilar membrane.

The cochlear duct of the owl contains the basilar papilla, the tectorial membrane, the tegmentum vasculum, and the macula of the lagena. The basilar papilla of the cochlea was measured to be 9.5-11.5 mm long. Proximal sensory hair cells contained mostly short hair cells along with a few intermediate hair cells, but absolutely no tall hair cells. Tall hair cells are only present on the distal half of the owl's papilla, starting at about 5 mm from the proximal end, along with some short-haired cells. The distal tip of the papilla is occupied exclusively by tall hair cells, whereas the proximal tip is occupied exclusively by lenticular cells.

Two major parts that construct the basilar membrane of the barn owl include the vestibular part and the tympanic part. The vestibular surface of the basilar membrane is covered by supporting cells and a few border cells at the inferior edge of the membrane. The basilar membrane is relatively thin toward the distal end of the papilla, but has a thick fibrous mass toward the proximal end. This dense fibrous mass measured to be about 37-57 μm in width and 8.5-11 μm in thickness among the owls utilized for this study. This mass is not to be confused with the loose fibrous mass of the tympanic part of the basilar membrane that underlies the part of the basilar membrane that is covered by sensory cells. The loose fibrous mass of the tympanic part arises at the proximal tip along with the dense fibrous mass, but the loose fibrous mass covers a greater width of the basilar membrane. The only thing that separates the vestibular and tympanic parts are thin, discontinuous cords of fibers. These cords of fibers are visible at the pendulous tympanic edge of the loose fibrous mass in the proximal part of the papilla, but are much more scattered throughout the mass distally.

== How ears asymmetry develops ==
Researchers have studied the embryonic development of ear asymmetry in the American barn owl (Tyto furcata pratincola) in the frame of 42 different stages of embryonic development. The experiment began by taking 19 embryos from the Institute of Biology to RWTH Aachen University. The embryos were either raised by the hen or were incubated in a Compact S84. The embryos utilized in the study were between stage 29 and stage 41 of embryonic development, with those between stages 36-39 being examined a bit more frequently than others. Micro CT-scans were used to measure the asymmetry of the ear during development, with some scans being taken using the Skyscan 1172. Aluminum filters were used to optimize image quality and phosphotungstic acid (PTA) was used to enhance soft tissue extract in the embryos. Markers were set on the embryonic heads to track differential growth. NRecon was used to reconstruct raw data, three-dimensional objects were calculated in Reconstruct, photographs were produced in Blender, and all final figures were constructed with Matlab and CorelDraw X6. The center of the ear opening, squamosum, stapes, eye lens, nose, and premaxilla were all tracked in the study. The cervical vertebra (C1) and the pituitary gland were used to define the anatomical coordinate system. Measurements of the ear-opening, surface area of the ear, and eccentricity were derived using various equations.

Through the examination of data, the development of ear asymmetry was apparent throughout the stages of embryonic development. The ears appeared slit-like at stage 29 of embryonic development and took on the ellipsoid shape at stage 32, which is also when outer ear development began. Dorso-occipital movement of the outer ear began symmetrically at stage 34, but asymmetry rapidly increased from this dorso-occipital movement by stage 37. Surface area between stages 32 and 35 was 0.4-0.5 mm2, with eccentricity between the right and left ear differing by less than 0.1 mm. Between stages 36 and 37, the surface area was 0.6-1.9 mm2. Eccentricity was no longer measured after stage 37 since the ear-opening shapes were no longer ellipsoid. The rostral margin of the ear opening started to flatten at stage 38, with the higher ear on the head having more dorso-ventral flattening. The angle of flattening margins at stage 38 differed by 18.5 degrees, but by only 16 degrees at stage 39. Ear asymmetry did not increase between stages 40 and 41, as ear asymmetry reached maximum at stage 39. The margin differed by 21 degrees at stage 40 and by 33 degrees at stage 41.

Ear asymmetry appeared to be restricted to the outer ear opening and the outer ear canal, as the auditory system was found to be symmetrically arranged from the eardrum. From the findings of this study, researchers concluded that the ear openings start to move dorso-occipitally at stage 34. The left ear opening begins to move faster than the right ear opening, thus leading to development of ear asymmetry from stage 36 to 39, with maximum asymmetry occurring at stage 39. Researchers suggest that asymmetry produced by further movement in the left ear opening may be caused by the movement of structures within the embryo since this movement does not affect other anatomical landmarks on the left side of the head, as the skull and other anatomical markers in the American barn owl remain to be symmetrical.

== ITD and ILD ==
Owls must be able to determine the necessary angle of descent, i.e. the elevation, in addition to azimuth (horizontal angle to the sound). This bi-coordinate sound localization is accomplished through two binaural cues: the interaural time difference (ITD) and the interaural level difference (ILD), also known as the interaural intensity difference (IID). The ability in owls is unusual; in ground-bound mammals such as mice, ITD and ILD are not utilized in the same manner. In these mammals, ITDs tend to be utilized for localization of lower frequency sounds, while ILDs tend to be used for higher frequency sounds.

ITD occurs whenever the distance from the source of sound to the two ears is different, resulting in differences in the arrival times of the sound at the two ears. When the sound source is directly in front of the owl, there is no ITD, i.e. the ITD is zero. In sound localization, ITDs are used as cues for location in the azimuth. ITD changes systematically with azimuth. Sounds to the right arrive first at the right ear; sounds to the left arrive first at the left ear.

In mammals there is a level difference in sounds at the two ears caused by the sound-shadowing effect of the head. But in many species of owls, level differences arise primarily for sounds that are shifted above or below the elevation of the horizontal plane. This is due to the asymmetry in placement of the ear openings in the owl's head, such that sounds from below the owl are louder in the left and sounds from above are louder in the right. IID is a measure of the difference in the level of the sound as it reaches each ear. In many owls, IIDs for high-frequency sounds (higher than 4 or 5 kHz) are the principal cues for locating sound elevation.

== The role of vision in learning sound localization ==
Owls have a very evolved capacity for sound localization, which has a lot of innate neuronal connections. This provides owls with an advantage over many mammals, as their neuronal connections do not require much learning. For this reason, visual cues are slightly less important to owls, especially when it comes to utilizing sound localization. Their eyes are nonspherical and immobile in their head, making it difficult for them to orient their eyes towards visual cues.

Dr. Eric Knudsen performed many different experiments on barn owls over the course of several years to study how vision plays a role in their ability to localize sounds. His studies focused on how visual cues help in mapping parts of the forebrain and midbrain, and also tested if vision impairment has an effect on sound localization in juvenile owls. The results from these studies showed that impairing the visual field of juvenile owls did have a slight effect on their responses to visual cues. However, the longer the owls had visual impairment, the easier it was for them to learn to adapt and correct the error of the auditory cues. It has been hypothesized that because owls are born with these innate neuronal connections, they already understand how to use sound localization without having to develop this technique. As for the effect on the brain, Knudsen was able to conclude that if the owl's optic tectum was inactivated, then the owl's brain would have changes in the auditory orienting behavior. As the optic tectum is involved in orienting attention, this explains why some of the owls utilized in his study would elicit a response while others would not. It was also found that this inactivation in the optic tectum could lead to a deficiency in sensory or motor space processing.

The results from Knudsen's studies showed that barn owls have the ability to adapt to vision impairments because of innate neuronal connections that they are born with. Therefore it can be concluded that, unlike most mammals, owls do not often utilize visual cues or stimuli to aid with sound localization. Furthermore, research conducted by Dr. Wagner showed that owls primarily utilize auditory cues for sound localization rather than visual cues.

== Parallel processing pathways in the brain ==
The axons of the auditory nerve originate from the hair cells of the cochlea in the inner ear. Different sound frequencies are encoded by different fibers of the auditory nerve, arranged along the length of the auditory nerve, but codes for the timing and level of the sound are not segregated within the auditory nerve. Instead, the ITD is encoded by phase locking, i.e. firing at or near a particular phase angle of the sinusoidal stimulus sound wave, and the IID is encoded by spike rate. Both parameters are carried by each fiber of the auditory nerve.

The fibers of the auditory nerve innervate both cochlear nuclei in the brainstem, the cochlear nucleus magnocellularis (mammalian anteroventral cochlear nucleus) and the cochlear nucleus angularis (see figure; mammalian posteroventral and dorsal cochlear nuclei). The neurons of the nucleus magnocellularis phase-lock, but are fairly insensitive to variations in sound pressure, while the neurons of the nucleus angularis phase-lock poorly, if at all, but are sensitive to variations in sound pressure. These two nuclei are the starting points of two separate but parallel pathways to the inferior colliculus: the pathway from nucleus magnocellularis processes ITDs, and the pathway from nucleus angularis processes IID.

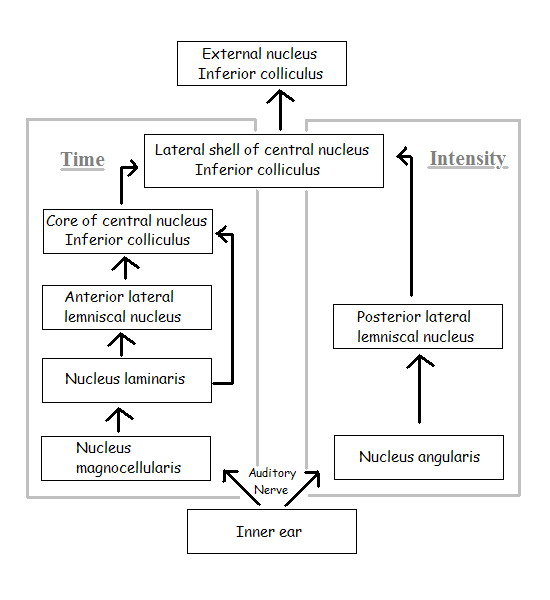
Parallel processing pathways in the brain for time and level for sound localization in the owl

In the time pathway, the nucleus laminaris (mammalian medial superior olive) is the first site of binaural convergence. It is here that ITD is detected and encoded using neuronal delay lines and coincidence detection, as in the Jeffress model; when phase-locked impulses coming from the left and right ears coincide at a laminaris neuron, the cell fires most strongly. Thus, the nucleus laminaris acts as a delay-line coincidence detector, converting distance traveled to time delay and generating a map of interaural time difference. Neurons from the nucleus laminaris project to the core of the central nucleus of the inferior colliculus and to the anterior lateral lemniscal nucleus.

In the sound level pathway, the posterior lateral lemniscal nucleus (mammalian lateral superior olive) is the site of binaural convergence and where IID is processed. Stimulation of the contralateral ear inhibits and that of the ipsilateral ear excites the neurons of the nuclei in each brain hemisphere independently. The degree of excitation and inhibition depends on sound pressure, and the difference between the strength of the inhibitory input and that of the excitatory input determines the rate at which neurons of the lemniscal nucleus fire. Thus the response of these neurons is a function of the difference in sound pressure between the two ears.

The time and sound-pressure pathways converge at the lateral shell of the central nucleus of the inferior colliculus. The lateral shell projects to the external nucleus, where each space-specific neuron responds to acoustic stimuli only if the sound originates from a restricted area in space, i.e. the receptive field of that neuron. These neurons respond exclusively to binaural signals containing the same ITD and IID that would be created by a sound source located in the neuron's receptive field. Thus their receptive fields arise from the neurons' tuning to particular combinations of ITD and IID, simultaneously in a narrow range. These space-specific neurons can thus form a map of auditory space in which the positions of receptive fields in space are isomorphically projected onto the anatomical sites of the neurons.

== Significance of asymmetrical ears for localization of elevation ==
The ears of many species of owls are asymmetrical. For example, in barn owls (Tyto alba), the placement of the two ear flaps (operculi) lying directly in front of the ear canal opening is different for each ear. This asymmetry is such that the center of the left ear flap is slightly above a horizontal line passing through the eyes and directed downward, while the center of the right ear flap is slightly below the line and directed upward. In two other species of owls with asymmetrical ears, the saw-whet owl and the long-eared owl, the asymmetry is achieved by different means: in saw whets, the skull is asymmetrical; in the long-eared owl, the skin structures lying near the ear form asymmetrical entrances to the ear canals, which is achieved by a horizontal membrane. Thus, ear asymmetry seems to have evolved on at least three different occasions among owls. Because owls depend on their sense of hearing for hunting, this convergent evolution in owl ears suggests that asymmetry is important for sound localization in the owl.

Ear asymmetry allows for sound originating from below the eye level to sound louder in the left ear, while sound originating from above the eye level to sound louder in the right ear. Asymmetrical ear placement also causes IID for high frequencies (between 4 kHz and 8 kHz) to vary systematically with elevation, converting IID into a map of elevation. Thus, it is essential for an owl to have the ability to hear high frequencies. Many birds have the neurophysiological machinery to process both ITD and IID, but because they have small heads and low frequency sensitivity, they use both parameters only for localization in the azimuth. Through evolution, the ability to hear frequencies higher than 3 kHz, the highest frequency of owl flight noise, enabled owls to exploit elevational IIDs, produced by small ear asymmetries that arose by chance, and began the evolution of more elaborate forms of ear asymmetry.

Another demonstration of the importance of ear asymmetry in owls is that, in experiments, owls with symmetrical ears, such as the screech owl (Otus asio) and the great horned owl (Bubo virginianus), could not be trained to locate prey in total darkness, whereas owls with asymmetrical ears could be trained.

== Facial adaptions for sound localization ==
The well-developed facial ruff that owls have adapted has shown to help with sound localization as the ruff works to funnel, trap, and focus sounds. The ruff is located around the owl's face and acts as a reflector for sound. Owls have specific feathers on their head that help direct sound toward their external ear openings, known as reflector feathers, as well as feathers that help prevent the ruff from getting dirty, known as auricular feathers. Reflector feathers sit around the border of the ruff, are very dense, and have been found to help with the ramification of sounds. Auricular feathers, on the other hand, are located around the facial disc of the owl and, unlike reflector feathers, are very loose and do not aid with the ramification of sounds. Owls also have a third type of feather, known as contour feathers, that are found everywhere on the owl's body except in the facial ruff, but do not at all assist in the ability to localize sounds. Contour feathers are instead useful for things such as flight and conservation of body heat.

Scientists Campenhausen and Wagner performed a study in 2006 on the true relevance of the facial ruff for sound localization. The researchers used five barn owls and studied how well the owls could localize sounds when the facial ruff was completely intact, when the auricular feathers were removed, when the reflector feathers were removed, and when all of the feathers on the head were removed. The owls that had a fully intact facial ruff were able to hear a vast range of sounds very efficiently and with specific directionality. Upon removal of the auricular feathers, the results showed that the owls were not greatly affected, but the range at which the owls could efficiently hear different sounds slightly decreased. When the reflector feathers were removed from the owls, however, the results showed an extreme decrease in both the owls' hearing range and the directionality of its hearing. When all the feathers were removed from the owls' heads, the results did not show any major difference in hearing or directionality when compared to the removal of the previous feathers. This study went further to show that the removal of these kinds of feathers also has an influence on the ITD and ILD in owls' hearing. The most influential feathers were the reflector feathers, as the removal of these feathers showed to make the owls' ears more sensitive and selective, and it also extended the physiological range of the ITD. Another study conducted by Hausmann and Campenhausen in 2009 was performed to further confirm the significance of the facial ruff on sound localization in owls.
