= Plasmodium forresteri =

Scientific classification
- Domain: Eukaryota
- Clade: Sar
- Clade: Alveolata
- Phylum: Apicomplexa
- Class: Aconoidasida
- Order: Haemospororida
- Family: Plasmodiidae
- Genus: Plasmodium
- Species: P. forresteri

Binomial name
- Plasmodium forresteri Telford, 1979

Species of single-celled organism

Plasmodium forresteri is a parasite of the genus Plasmodium.

Like all Plasmodium species P. forresteri has both vertebrate and insect hosts. The vertebrate hosts for this parasite are birds.

== Description ==
The parasite was first described by Telford et al. in 1979.

== Geographical occurrence ==
This organism is found in Florida and southern Georgia, United States.

== Clinical features and host pathology ==
This organism naturally infects the following species:

- Eastern screech-owls (Otus asio)
- Great horned owls (Bubo virginianus)
- Barred owls (Strix varia)
- Bald eagles (Haliaeetus leucocephalus)
- Red-shouldered hawks (Buteo lineatus)
- Broad-winged hawks (Buteo platypterus)
- Red-tailed hawks (Buteo jamaicensis)

Experimental infections have been established in the following species:

- Japanese quail (Coturnix japonica)
- Pekin ducks (Anas platyrhynchos)

The only currently known mosquito vector is Culex restuans.
