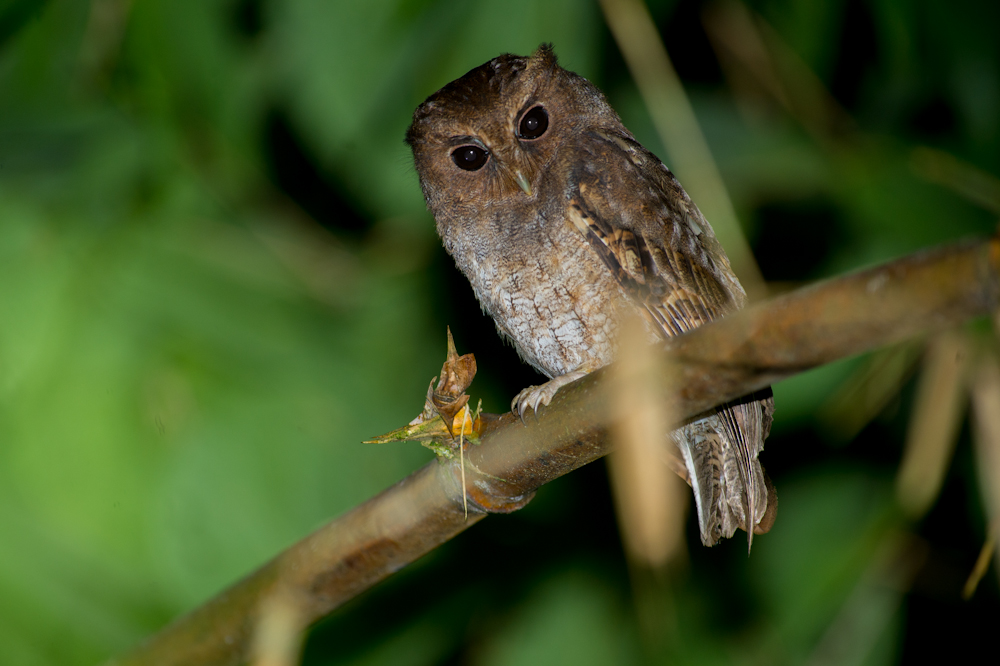

Conservation status
- Least Concern (IUCN 3.1)
- CITES Appendix II (CITES)

Scientific classification
- Domain: Eukaryota
- Kingdom: Animalia
- Phylum: Chordata
- Class: Aves
- Order: Strigiformes
- Family: Strigidae
- Genus: Megascops
- Species: M. ingens

Binomial name
- Megascops ingens (Salvin, 1897)

Synonyms
- Otus ingens (Salvin, 1897)

= Rufescent screech owl =

Species of owl

The rufescent screech owl (Megascops ingens) is a species of owl in the family Strigidae. It is found in Bolivia, Colombia, Ecuador, Peru, and Venezuela.

== Taxonomy and systematics ==
The rufescent screech owl has three subspecies, the nominate M. i. ingens, M. i. venezuelanus, and M. i. columbianus. The last was formerly considered a distinct species, "Colombian screech owl". Two other forms that had previously been described as subspecies are now treated as individual variations of the nominate.

== Description ==
The rufescent screech owl is one of the larger species of its genus, similar in size to the white-throated screech owl (M. albogularis). Its overall length is 25 to 28 cm (9.8 to 11.0 in) and weight in males is 134 to 180 g (4.7 to 6.3 oz) and in females 140 to 223 g (4.9 to 7.9 oz). The nominate subspecies is sandy brown above with darker vermiculation. Its facial disc is sandy brown, without a distinct rim. The flight feathers are barred cinnamon and dusky and the tail is cinnamon with darker brown bars. The hind crown has buffy-whitish border. It has honey brown eyes and small ear tufts. The tarsi are feathered to the base of the toes. M. i. venezuelanus is slightly smaller and paler than the nominate. M. columbianus is also smaller than the nominate and its tarsi are not fully feathered.

== Distribution and habitat ==
The nominate subspecies of rufescent screech owl is found on the eastern slope of the Andes from southwestern Colombia through Ecuador and Peru to central Bolivia. In elevation it ranges from 1,200 to 2,250 m (3,940 to 7,380 ft) in Ecuador, from 1,000 to 2,200 m (3,300 to 7,200 ft) in Peru, and from 700 to 2,200 m (2,300 to 7,200 ft) in Bolivia. M. i. venezuelanus is found in northern Colombia and northwestern Venezuela; its elevational range has not been determined. M. columbianus is found on the western slope of the Andes from west central Colombia into northwestern Ecuador. In Colombia it ranges in elevation from 1,250 to 2,450 m (4,100 to 8,040 ft) and in Ecuador 1,300 to 2,300 m (4,300 to 7,500 ft).

The rufescent screech owl inhabits a wide variety of forest types including the interior and edges of mature evergreen and secondary forest and pastures with scattered trees. It appears to accept fragmented habitats.

== Behavior ==
=== Feeding ===
The rufescent screech owl is nocturnal, like most others of its genus. Its hunting techniques have not been documented. Its diet is assumed to be larger insects and spiders, and at least one small vertebrate has been noted as prey.

=== Breeding ===
The rufescent screech owl's breeding phenology is essentially undocumented. In western Colombia it is believed to nest between December and March. Though its nest and eggs have not been described, it is assumed to nest in a tree cavity like others of its genus.

=== Vocalization ===
The rufescent screech owl's primary (territorial) song is "a series of flute-like, staccato notes, which begins softly on a lower pitch, shortly rising to a higher, steadily maintained pitch". A second song, believed to be used in courtship, is "a 2-3 weak introductory notes followed by a short series of hoots all on the same pitch". Both sexes sing both songs, though the females' are higher pitched.

== Status ==
The IUCN has assessed the rufescent screech owl as being of Least Concern. However, its population is unknown and believed to be decreasing. It is "vulnerable to deforestation, which is advancing throughout its range".
