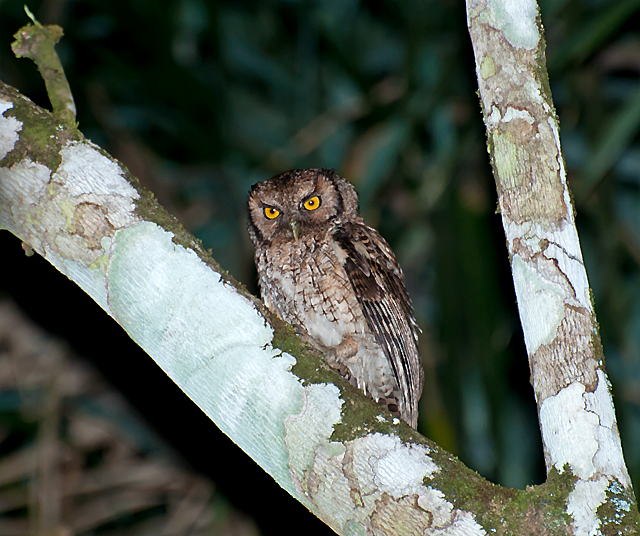
- In São Paulo, Brazil

Conservation status
- Least Concern (IUCN 3.1)
- CITES Appendix II

Scientific classification
- Kingdom: Animalia
- Phylum: Chordata
- Class: Aves
- Order: Strigiformes
- Family: Strigidae
- Genus: Megascops
- Species: M. atricapilla

Binomial name
- Megascops atricapilla (Temminck, 1822)

Synonyms
- Otus atricapillus (Temminck, 1822); Otus atricapilla (Temminck, 1822)

= Black-capped screech owl =

Species of owl

The black-capped screech owl (Megascops atricapilla), or variable screech owl, is a species of owl in the family Strigidae. It is found in Argentina, Brazil, and Paraguay.

== Taxonomy and systematics ==
The black-capped screech owl is monotypic. It is part of a complex of species that includes the Santa Marta screech owl (M. gilesi), West Peruvian screech owl (M. roboratus), tawny-bellied screech owl (M. watsonii), and perhaps other undescribed species.

== Description ==
The black-capped screech owl is 22 to 23 cm (8.7 to 9.1 in) long. Males weigh 115 to 140 g (4.1 to 4.9 oz) and females up to 160 g (5.6 oz). It occurs in brown, rufous, and gray morphs. All have a light facial disc with a distinct dark border, a blackish crown, and prominent "ear" tufts. Their eye color ranges from dark brown to amber. The brown morph's upperparts are dark brown with pale mottling and vermiculation. The folded wing shows a line of pale spots. The underparts are paler with irregular markings. The other two morphs are redder and grayer respectively.

== Distribution and habitat ==
The black-capped screech owl is found in southeastern Brazil, southeastern Paraguay, and extreme northeastern Argentina. It inhabits a variety of landscapes, especially lowland rainforest and including forest with thick undergrowth, edges, open woodland, and secondary forest. In the northern part of its range it is found from sea level to at least 600 m (2,000 ft) but in the south only to 300 m (980 ft)

== Behavior ==
=== Feeding ===
The black-capped screech owl usually hunts in the forest canopy, scanning for prey from a perch, but it also frequently hunts in undergrowth. Its diet is primarily insects and also probably includes small vertebrates.

=== Breeding ===
The black-capped screech owl's breeding season appears to include October and November, but has not been fully defined. It nests in tree cavities, both natural and made by woodpeckers. It might be semi-colonial, as it has been recorded nesting close to others of its species.

=== Vocalization ===
The black-capped screech owl's primary song is "a long fast trill, very faint before increasing in volume, [and] ending abruptly". Its secondary song is short, with a "bouncing-ball rhythm". Both sexes sing in duet and the female's voice is higher pitched.

== Status ==
The IUCN has assessed the black-capped screech owl as being of Least Concern. Its population number and trend are unknown. It "seems to require fairly large areas of forest in some areas, and it may not be able to survive in remnant forest reserves."
