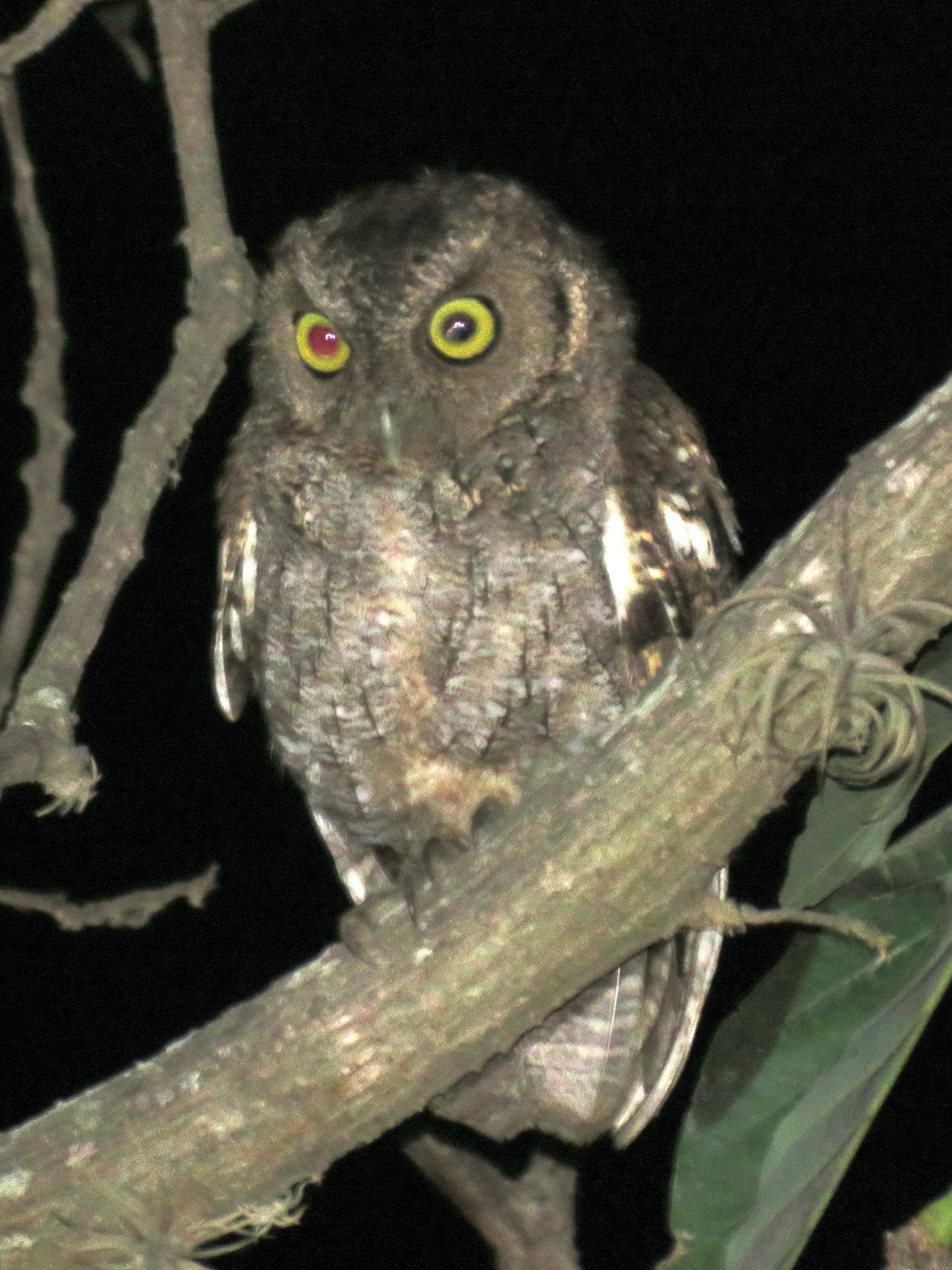

Conservation status
- Least Concern (IUCN 3.1)
- CITES Appendix II

Scientific classification
- Kingdom: Animalia
- Phylum: Chordata
- Class: Aves
- Order: Strigiformes
- Family: Strigidae
- Genus: Megascops
- Species: M. roboratus

Binomial name
- Megascops roboratus (Bangs & Noble, 1918)

Synonyms
- Otus roboratus Bangs & Noble, 1918

= West Peruvian screech owl =

Species of owl

The West Peruvian screech owl or Peruvian screech owl (Megascops roboratus) is a species of owl in the family Strigidae. It is found in Ecuador and Peru.

== Taxonomy and systematics ==
The West Peruvian screech owl has sometimes been treated as conspecific with the tropical screech owl (M. choliba) though their vocalizations are distinct. Two subspecies are recognized, the nominate M. r. roboratus and M. r. pacificus. The latter has been suggested as a species in its own right.

== Description ==
The nominate subspecies of West Peruvian screech owl is 20 to 22 cm (7.9 to 8.7 in) long and weighs 144 to 162 g (5.1 to 5.7 oz). It has both gray and rufous morphs. The former has a grayish facial disc with a black border, white brows above pale to golden yellow eyes, and small "ear" tufts. The crown is blackish brown and the upperparts gray brown with slight darker bars. It has a pale nuchal collar. Its underparts are whitish with faint vermiculation. The rufous morph is pale rufous all over with dark brown markings.

M. r. pacificus is smaller and lighter than the nominate, 18 to 19 cm (7.1 to 7.5 in) long and weighing 70 to 90 g (2.5 to 3.2 oz). Its gray morph is typically grayer than the nominate but there is much overlap. Its rufous morph is more common than that of the nominate.

== Distribution and habitat ==
The pacificus subspecies of West Peruvian screech owl is found from Santa Elena and Guayas Provinces in southwestern Ecuador south slightly into northwestern Peru as far as Lambayeque Province. The nominate M. r. roboratus is found inland, in the drainages of the Río Chinchipe and Río Marañón between the western and central Andes.

M. r. roboratus inhabits dry deciduous woodland, on mountain slopes and hills. In elevation it mostly ranges between 500 and 1,200 m (1,600 and 3,900 ft) but is found as high as 1,800 m (5,900 ft) in Eduador and 2,100 m (6,900 ft) in Peru. M. r. pacificus inhabits dry coastal scrub and deciduous forest, generally from sea level to 500 m (1,600 ft).

== Behavior ==
=== Feeding ===
As far as is known, the West Peruvian screech owl is strictly nocturnal. Its diet is mostly, and possibly exclusively, insects.

=== Breeding ===
Both subspecies have been documented to nest in tree cavities, and the nominate has also possibly used old nests of the Pale-legged Hornero (Furnarius leucopus). Little else is known.

=== Vocalization ===
The nominate West Peruvian screech owl's song is "a trill of equally spaced notes increasing in volume toward the end". That of M. r. pacificus is "a similar trill that rises in volume and drops slightly in pitch at toward the end".

== Status ==
The IUCN has assessed the West Peruvian screech owl as being of Least Concern. However, it is "overall rare and possibly vulnerable" and "much habitat [has been] rendered unsuitable" by grazing and woodcutting.
