= Facial disc =

Concave collection of feathers surrounding the eyes of some birds

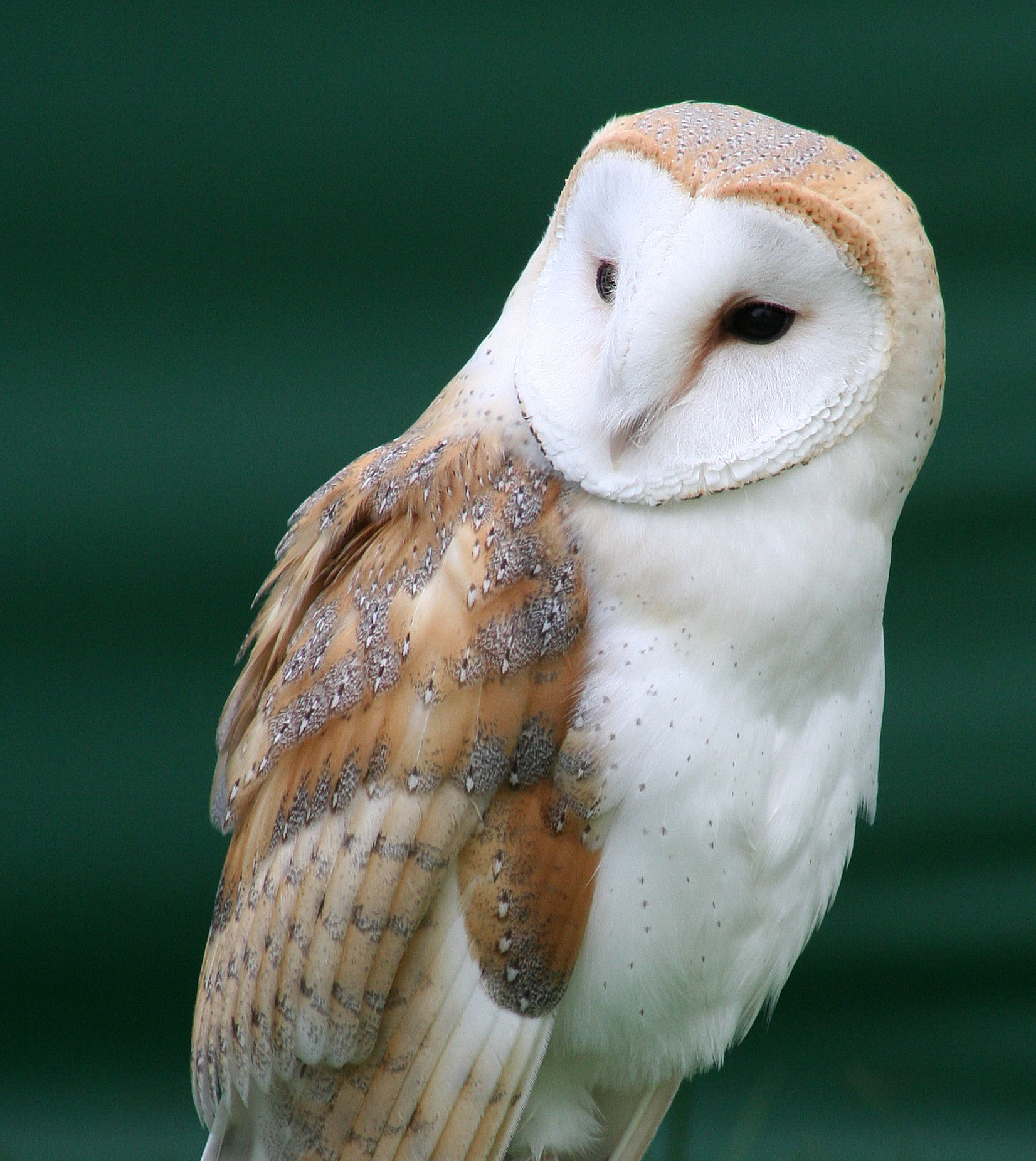
The barn owl, Tyto alba, has a prominent heart-shaped facial disc that aids it during hunting.

In ornithology, the facial disc is the concave collection of feathers on the face of some birds—most notably owls—surrounding the eyes. The concavity of the facial disc forms a circular paraboloid that collects sound waves and directs those waves towards the bird's ears. The feathers making up this disc can be adjusted by the bird to alter the focal length of this sound collector, enabling the bird to focus at different distances and allowing it to locate prey by sound alone under snow, grass, and plant cover.

Other bird species, such as harriers, have less prominent facial discs. In harriers, the related term facial ruff refers to feathers around the neck that are raised in response to noise, essentially enlarging the facial disc and improving hearing.

The barn owl has the most visually prominent facial disc, measuring about 110 mm (Simmons), while the great grey owl has the largest disc of any bird.

Because of its shared inner ear anatomy with barn owls, it is theorized that the feathered dinosaur Mononykus may also have had a facial disc.

== Evolution of facial disc anatomy ==
=== In owls ===
Facial discs and associated underlying ear structures are thought to have evolved at least five separate times within the order of Strigiformes (all owls). Furthermore, since that conclusion was reached without examining every genus within Strigiformes, it remains possible that there may also be additional instances of facial disc evolution in owls that have not yet been catalogued. The five separate instances discovered so far include Tyto (barn owls, grass owls, and masked owls) and Phodilus (bay owls) in the family Tytonidae, and Bubo and Strix (horned owls, eagle owls, fish owls, and earless owls), Asio (eared owls), and Aegolius (saw-whet owls) in the family Strigidae. In addition to those five, the genus Strix in particular is suspected to include multiple independent instances of facial disc evolution, indicated by significant ear structure differences between species within that genus that exceeds the differences within other owl genera.

The facial disc and associated ear anatomy are thought to have evolved in response to selection pressures accompanying the shift to owls hunting primarily using sound. Specifically, the facial disc probably came about as owls transitioned to hunting mainly by hearing after hunting mainly by sight became more difficult. Factors that may have influenced the evolution of facial discs and asymmetrical ear placement include owls living in habitats with dense vegetation or snow cover (the great grey owl and snowy owl being examples of the latter), owls hunting at night, and owls hunting ground-based prey that are obscured by foliage as opposed to more readily visible avian prey. All of these factors make visual-based hunting more difficult, and so might have driven selection for adaptations that help with hunting by sound instead, such as the facial disc to help the owl hear its prey, as well as specialized silent wing feathers so the prey does not hear an approaching owl.

==== Feathers ====
The feathers of the facial disc are transparent to sound, to allow sound to pass through the disc to the ears below, whereas the stiffer facial ruff feathers around the rim of the disc reflect sound, directing it towards the face. Unfortunately, it is nearly impossible to trace the evolution of these specialized feather types, or of any feather evolution in general, given that the rarity of feathers in the fossil record severely hampers gathering of knowledge about any bird species that are not currently living. But while it may be difficult to ascertain when a given feather type evolved, it is possible to make an educated guess on what other kind of feathers it might have evolved from, via comparison of feather structures at the microscopic level. This method yields the conclusion that in barn owls, feathers in the facial disc may have evolved from contour feathers, are the feathers that cover the owl's body and the back of its head. The open structure of the feathers that comprise the facial disc represent a simplification of the contour feather structure, rather than an increase in complexity.

In the barn owl, an owl species with one of the most conspicuous facial discs, the uniform white color of the feathers in the facial disc are thought to a function only for sound collection rather than display. (See first image above.) Closely spaced barbs on feathers located directly over the ear openings may also function as barriers to protect the ear.

==== Skull ====
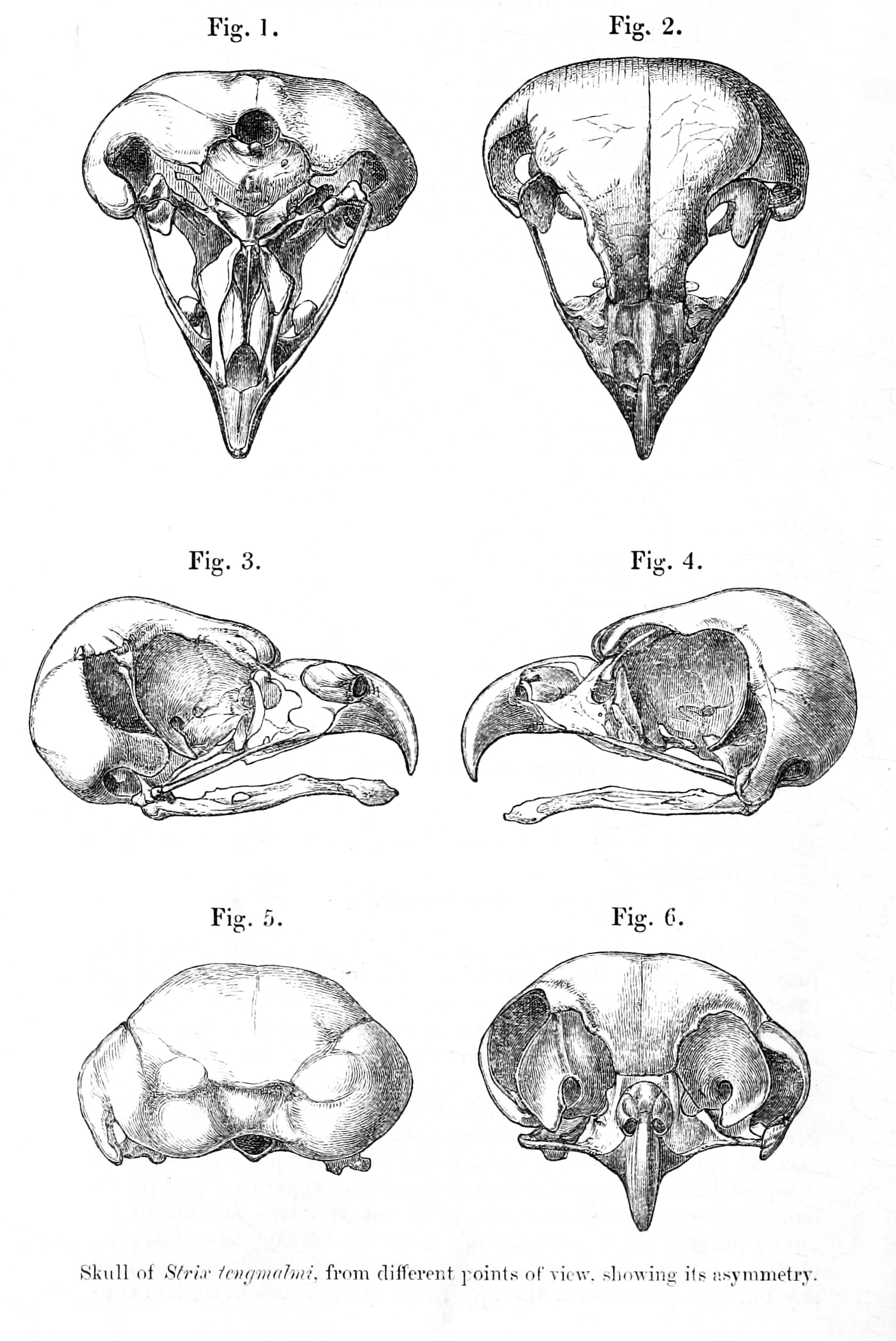
Figure 6 in the bottom right corner of this image is a head-on view of a Boreal Owl's skull, showing asymmetrical structures that direct the ear openings in different directions to assist in precise hearing.

The presence of the facial disc in owls, which acts like a component of the ear analogous to a human auricle, goes hand in hand with the unique ear structure beneath it. The symmetrical facial disc hides asymmetrical ear orientations underneath the feathers, where the two ears point at different angles. It is not the feathers or the ears themselves but rather the asymmetrical shape of the owl's skull that causes the ears to be oriented this way. (See Figure 6 in bottom right corner of the image at right.) Asymmetrically oriented ears enable an owl to determine where a sound is coming from without tilting its head by comparing the different sounds received by each ear; the facial disc further enhances this sound collection. When studying the evolution of owl hearing, the distinctive skull shape of owls, indicative of asymmetrical ears, is used as a proxy for the presence of an accompanying facial disc, since the facial disc and ear structure work together to improve hearing, and presumably evolved in tandem in response to the same selection pressures.

=== In harriers ===
Harriers (birds of prey in the genus Circus) have a similar arrangement of feathers on their faces, which gives them superior hearing compared to related diurnal raptors. Like owls, this consists of both a facial disc and a facial ruff. While harriers' facial discs are too small to give them the same precise hearing as owls' facial discs, this discrepancy can be offset by harriers' facial ruffs, which harriers can extend to enhance their hearing when necessary. Like harriers, the feathers in the facial ruff in the barn owl have also been found to contribute to the channeling of sound towards the ears in addition to the facial disc. This might be an example of convergent evolution between owls and harriers, since harriers and owls independently evolved facial ruffs, but the facial ruff shares the same structure across both groups and appears to serve the same function as well.

The evolutionary pressures that brought about harrier facial discs and facial ruffs are not fully understood, though some tentative conjectures have been proposed. In contrast to most owl species, harriers hunt during the day, so low vision at night is unlikely to have driven selection for better hearing. It is thought that hunting ground-based prey in thick vegetation played a role instead. Larger and more extensive facial discs and ruffs in harrier species that primarily go after terrestrial prey (such as the hen harrier), compared to smaller, incomplete facial discs and ruffs in harrier species that more commonly hunt birds and insects (such as European populations of Montagu's harrier), have been cited as evidence for this hypothesis. It is also possible that harrier facial discs and ruffs are vestigial.

== See also ==
- Sound localization in owls
