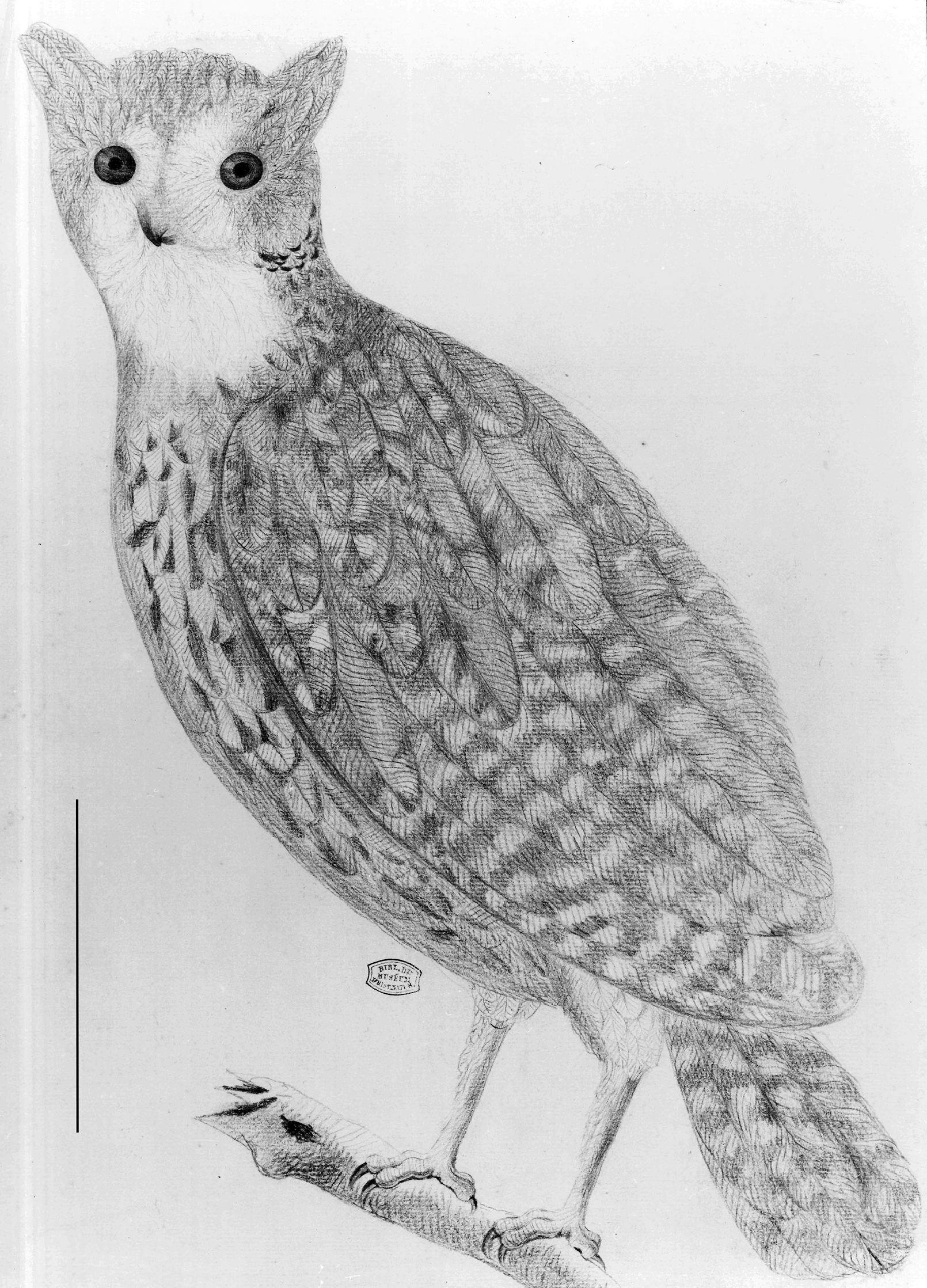
- Mascarenotus sauzieri

Scientific classification
- Kingdom: Animalia
- Phylum: Chordata
- Class: Aves
- Order: Strigiformes
- Family: Strigidae
- Genus: Otus

Species
- Otus grucheti Otus murivorus Otus sauzieri

Synonyms
- Mascarenotus Mourer-Chauviré Bour Moutou & Ribes, 1994

= Mascarene owls =

Mascarene owls Temporal range: Holocene

Extinct genus of birds

The Mascarene owls, also known as Mascarene scops owls or lizard owls, are a group of owls formerly classified in their own genus Mascarenotus, but now thought to represent a polyphyletic grouping within the genus Otus. They were restricted to the Mascarene Islands in the Indian Ocean. All three species, the Réunion scops owl, Mauritius scops owl, and Rodrigues scops owl, are now extinct.

Recent genetic studies indicate that the three species in the genus actually belong in the genus Otus, which contains the typical scops owls. They are likely descended from the lineage of the Oriental scops owl (O. sunia), and share common ancestry with the scops owls found in Madagascar and the Comoros. The Mascarenotus grouping was found to be non-monophyletic, with the species having evolved the same morphology in parallel evolution, with the Rodrigues owl forming an outgroup to the clade containing the Mauritius owl, the rainforest scops owl and the Seychelles scops owl.
