= Réunion scops owl =

Conservation status
- Extinct (late 17th century?) (IUCN 3.1)

Scientific classification
- Kingdom: Animalia
- Phylum: Chordata
- Class: Aves
- Order: Strigiformes
- Family: Strigidae
- Genus: Otus
- Species: †O. grucheti

Binomial name
- †Otus grucheti (Mourer-Chauviré, Bour, Moutou & Ribes, 1994)

Extinct species of owl

The Réunion scops owl (Otus grucheti) also known as the Réunion owl or Réunion lizard owl, is an extinct species of small owl that occurred on the Mascarene island of Réunion, but became extinct before any living birds were described; it is only known from subfossil bones. One of the three Mascarene owls, it was formerly classified in the genus Mascarenotus, and most likely was similar to a long-eared owl in size and appearance, but with nearly naked legs. However, according to recent studies, it and its relatives belong to the genus Otus, and is likely descended from the Otus sunia lineage.

Compared to the Mauritius scops owl and the Rodrigues scops owl, it was the most terrestrial species of the genus, with long legs and possibly somewhat reduced flight capability; more probably though it was simply smaller than the Mauritius bird – between that species and the one from Rodrigues in size – but had equally long legs: the only suitable food available in quantity on Réunion were small birds. It can be assumed to have preyed on sleeping songbirds in the manner of the unrelated but convergent Grallistrix "stilt-owls" from Hawaii.

== Extinction ==
As the bird is not mentioned by any contemporary report, it was either very secretive or became extinct earlier than its congeners. Notably, it is not contained in the comprehensive listing of local fauna that Dubois made in 1671–72. At that time, the only introduced predators were pigs. Inferring from the local ecology, it is likely that the birds succumbed to predation by rats and perhaps also cats as they must have been flight worthy enough to avoid the pigs, and thus only became extinct after Dubois' visit, at some date closer to the year 1700. If the bird was ground-nesting, however, it might have been extinct even by the time Dubois did not record it, but this hypothesis does not seem to agree what can be inferred from the rather long survival of its Mauritius relative.
