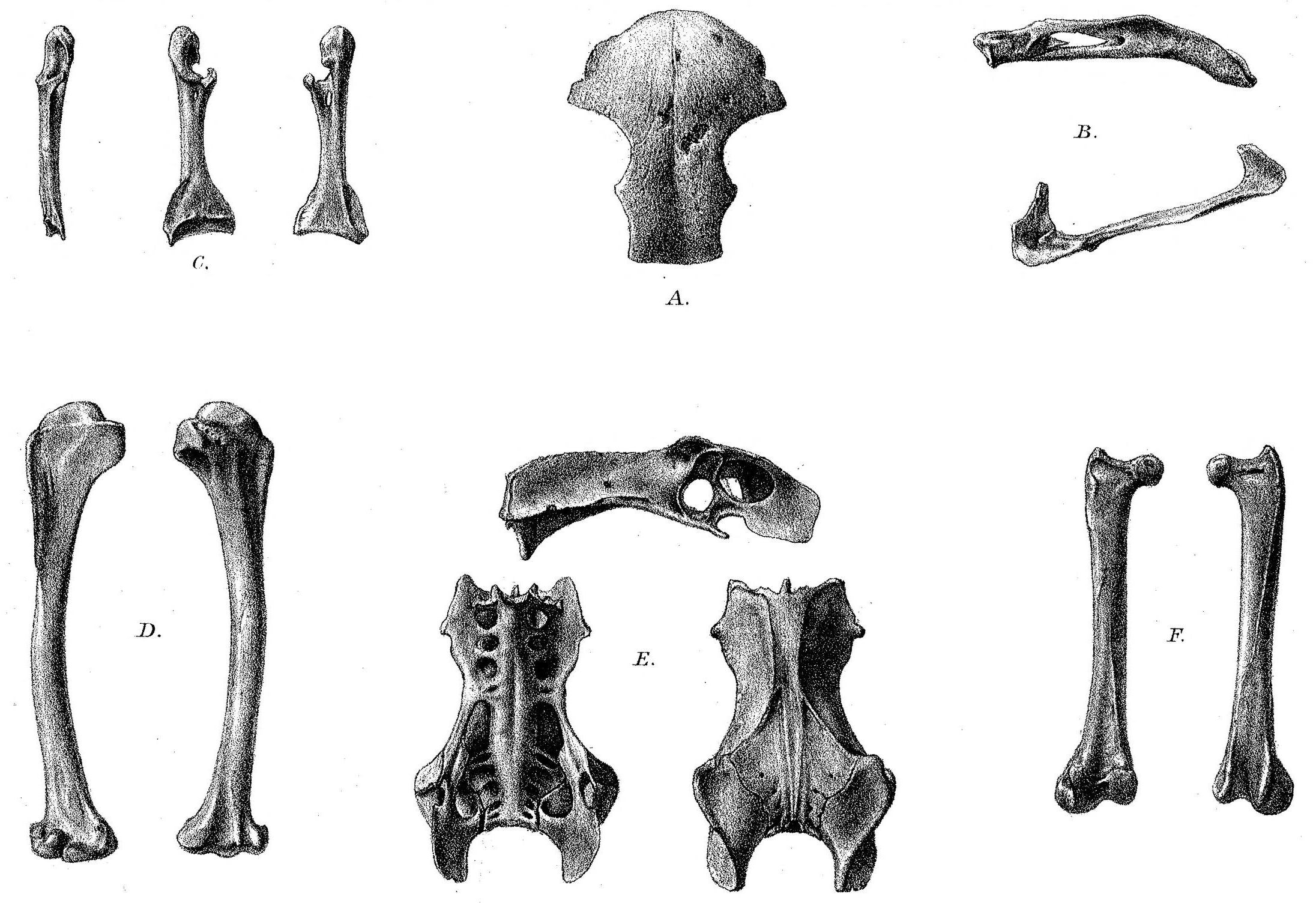
- Subfossils described in 1879

Conservation status
- Extinct (mid-18th century) (IUCN 3.1)

Scientific classification
- Kingdom: Animalia
- Phylum: Chordata
- Class: Aves
- Order: Strigiformes
- Family: Strigidae
- Genus: Otus
- Species: †O. murivorus

Binomial name
- †Otus murivorus (Milne-Edwards, 1873)
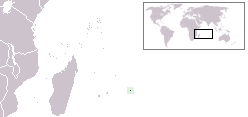
- Location of Rodrigues

Synonyms
- List: Strix murivora Milne-Edwards, 1873; Carine murivora Günther & E. Newton, 1879; Bubo leguati (female) Rothschild, 1907; Athene murivora (male) Rothschild, 1907; Mascarenotus murivorus Milne-Edwards, 1873

= Rodrigues scops owl =

Extinct species of owl

The Rodrigues scops owl (Otus murivorus), also known as Rodrigues owl, Rodrigues lizard owl, Leguat's owl, or (somewhat misleadingly) Rodrigues little owl, is an extinct species of small owl. It lived on the Mascarene island of Rodrigues before going extinct. It is part of the three Mascarene owls, formerly classified in the genus Mascarenotus, although they are now classified in the genus Otus. Like many of the Mascarene land-birds, the genus was a distinct relative to South-East Asian taxa, in this case apparently being a descendant of the direct ancestor of the Oriental scops owl.

== Taxonomy ==
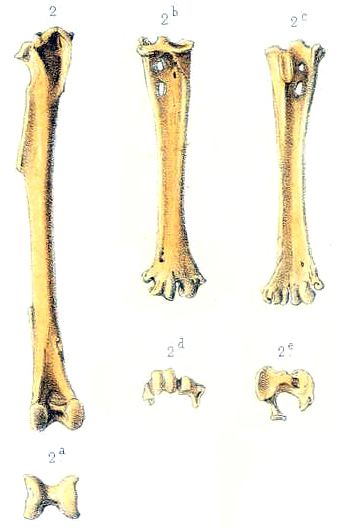
First known leg bones, 1873

It is sometimes assumed that Leguat mentioned this bird in his 1708 memoir, but this seems to be in error; Julien Tafforet gave a good description in 1726, however. The Rodrigues bird, which Tafforet compared to the petit-duc, the Eurasian scops owl (and not, as often assumed to the little owl, the chouette chevêche), was more arboreal than its congeners and fed on small birds and "lizards" (small specimens of the Rodrigues day gecko and the Rodrigues giant day gecko). A monotonous call was given in good weather.

Considering the bird's likely relationships as evidenced by the subfossil bones discovered later, and the detailed description of the related Mauritius scops owl, the Rodriguez bird was as large as a good-sized Australian boobook, with females reaching the size of a long-eared owl, and had ear tufts like an Otus owl and nearly naked legs.

In the original description, Milne-Edwards referred the bones to a Strix owl, mistakenly assuming that Tafforet had described a species of the tuftless owl genera. One larger tibiotarsus was assigned by him to the same sort of bird, but not described further. Günther & E. Newton, in their discussion of additional bones, quite logically assigned this bone to a female of this species, given that the small size of the island seems to preclude two competing similar species of owl to coexist. Rothschild, however, described the larger bone as type of what he assumed was a miniature eagle owl, Bubo leguati. It is nowadays accepted that the assignment to sex by Günther & Newton was correct.

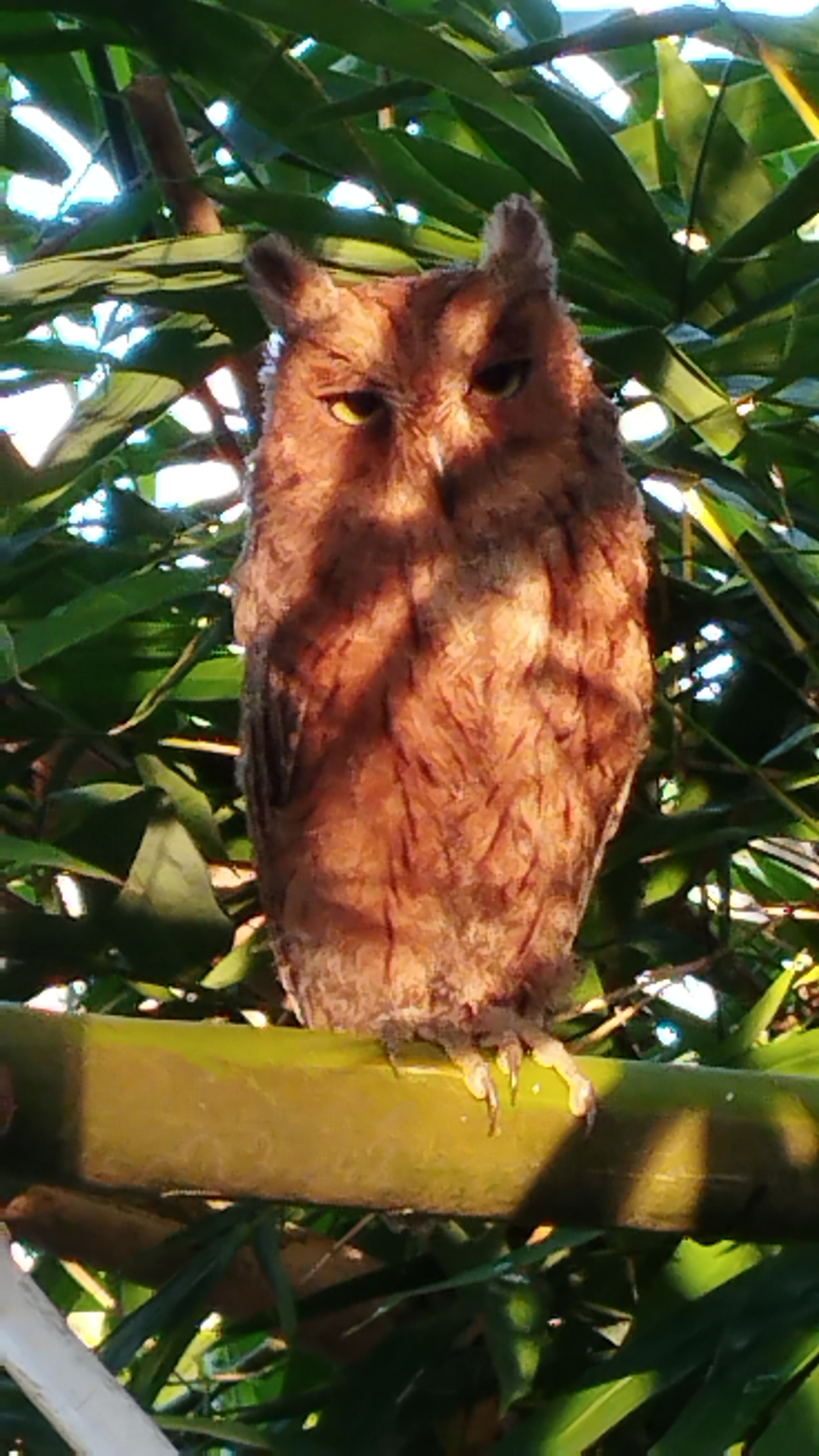
The Mayotte scops owl is genetically related

In 2018, a DNA study by Louchart and colleagues found that the Mascarenotus owls grouped among species of Otus (the scops owls), and therefore belonged to that genus. The cladogram below shows the placement of the Rodrigues owl:

- - - Otus mirus (Mindanao scops owl)
    - Otus longicornis (Luzon scops owl)
  - - Otus murivorus (Rodrigues scops owl)
    - Otus capnodes (Anjouan scops owl)
    - Otus moheliensis (Moheli scops owl)
    - Otus mayottensis (Mayotte scops owl)
    - - Otus insularis (Seychelles scops owl)
      - Otus sunia (oriental scops owl)
    - - Otus sauzieri (Mauritius scops owl)
      - Otus pauliani (Karthala scops owl)
      - - Otus rutilus madagascariensis (Torotoroka scops owl)
        - Otus rutilus rutilus (Rainforest scops owl)

== Description ==
This insular scops owl had evolved gigantism, becoming twice as large and four times heavier than its continental ancestor.

== Behaviour and ecology ==
Tafforet's description of the bird reads as follows in 1725-1726:

A bird is seen nearly like the earless owl, and which eats the small birds or the small lizards; they stay almost always in the trees, and when they feel the good weather; they sing at night; and always the same song on the contrary when they feel the bad weather they are not heard; (…) some Wagtails are seen, with some other small birds; which have a nice plumage, but they are always on the look out for the birds of prey which are the earless owls that I mentioned before;

Leguat mentioned the owl in passing:

In place of the Americans who have garter snakes naturally exterminating of this ugly breed, cats and dogs even that are trained to wage war on them, we had only the assistance of the owls and of our traps.

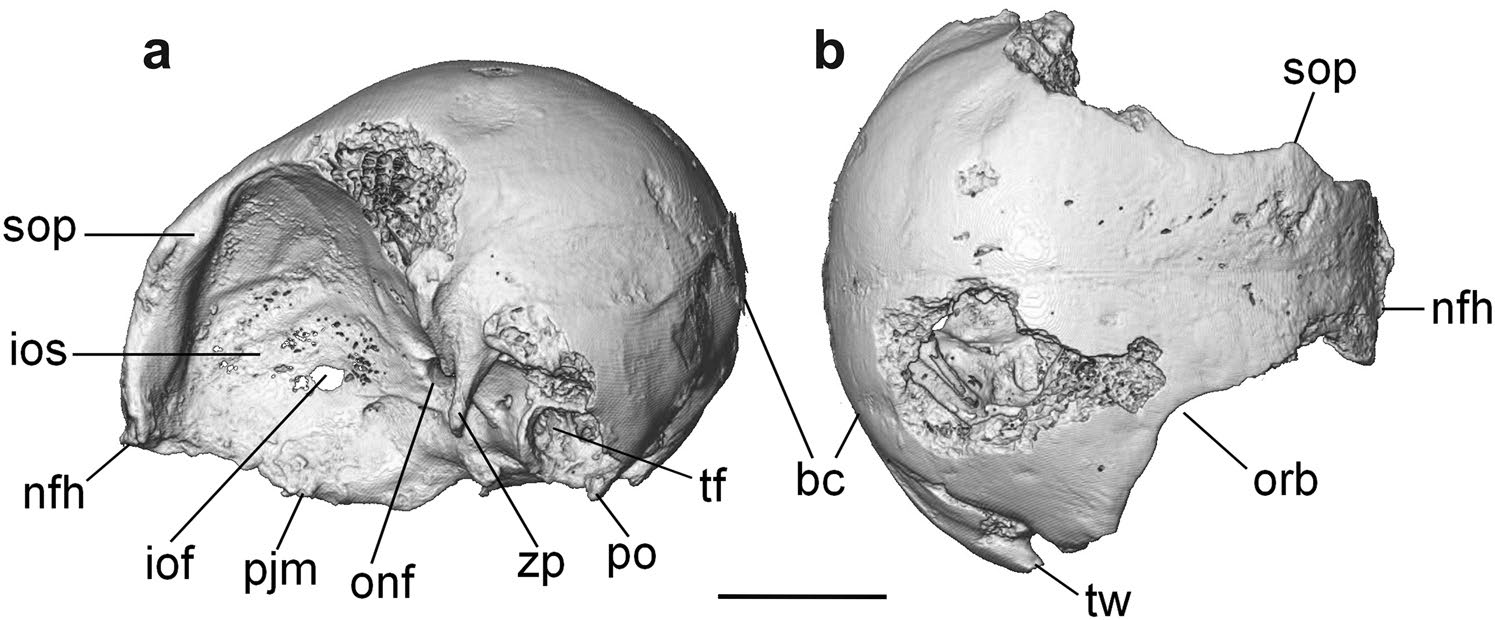
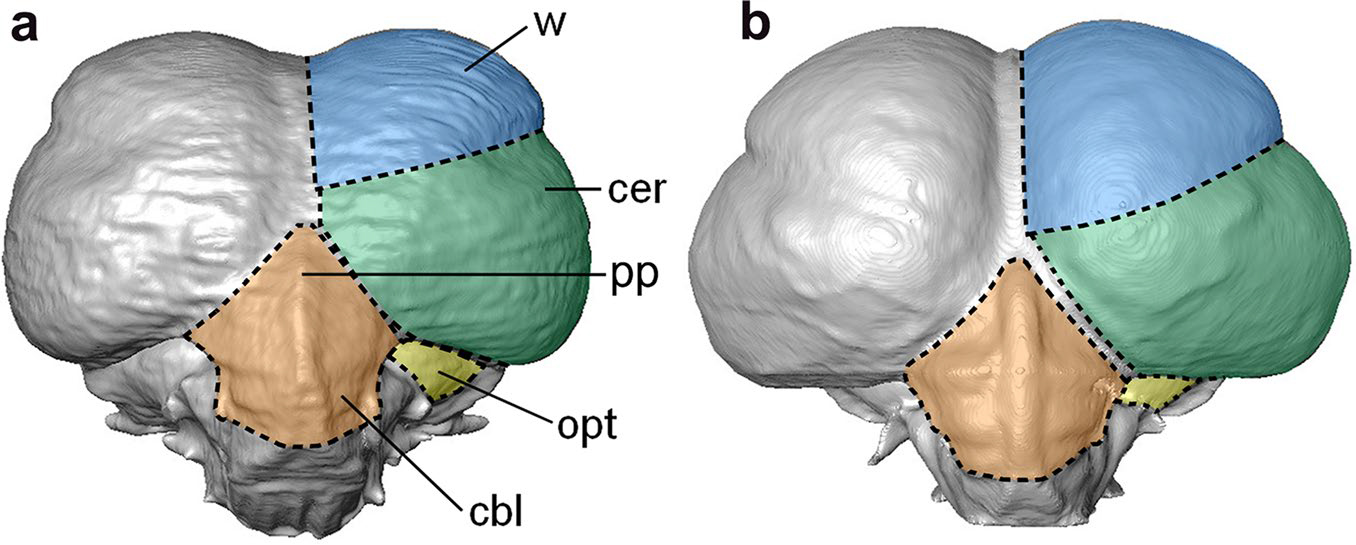
3D model of the cranium (above) and endocasts of this and the Oriental scops owl (below)

A 2020 X-ray microtomography study of the inner ear of the Rodrigues scops owl suggested some level of terrestrialisation and sedentarisation, supported by the reduction of the wings in this and the other Mascarene owls. Its sense of olfaction was better than it is extant relatives, which could indicate partial scavenging habits, and its more sideways facing eyes, smaller brain, fearlessness, less upright posture and increased size are consistent with specialisation on an isolated island.

== Extinction ==
Regardless of whether Leguat mentioned owls, Tafforet's record is the last reference to this bird. It probably was unable to cope with the ecological alterations and the predation which resulted from the human settlement and the large rat population.

The bird became apparently extinct in the mid-18th century; as Rodrigues is a small island, it is likely that Pingré would have recorded them in 1761 if they had still been present.
