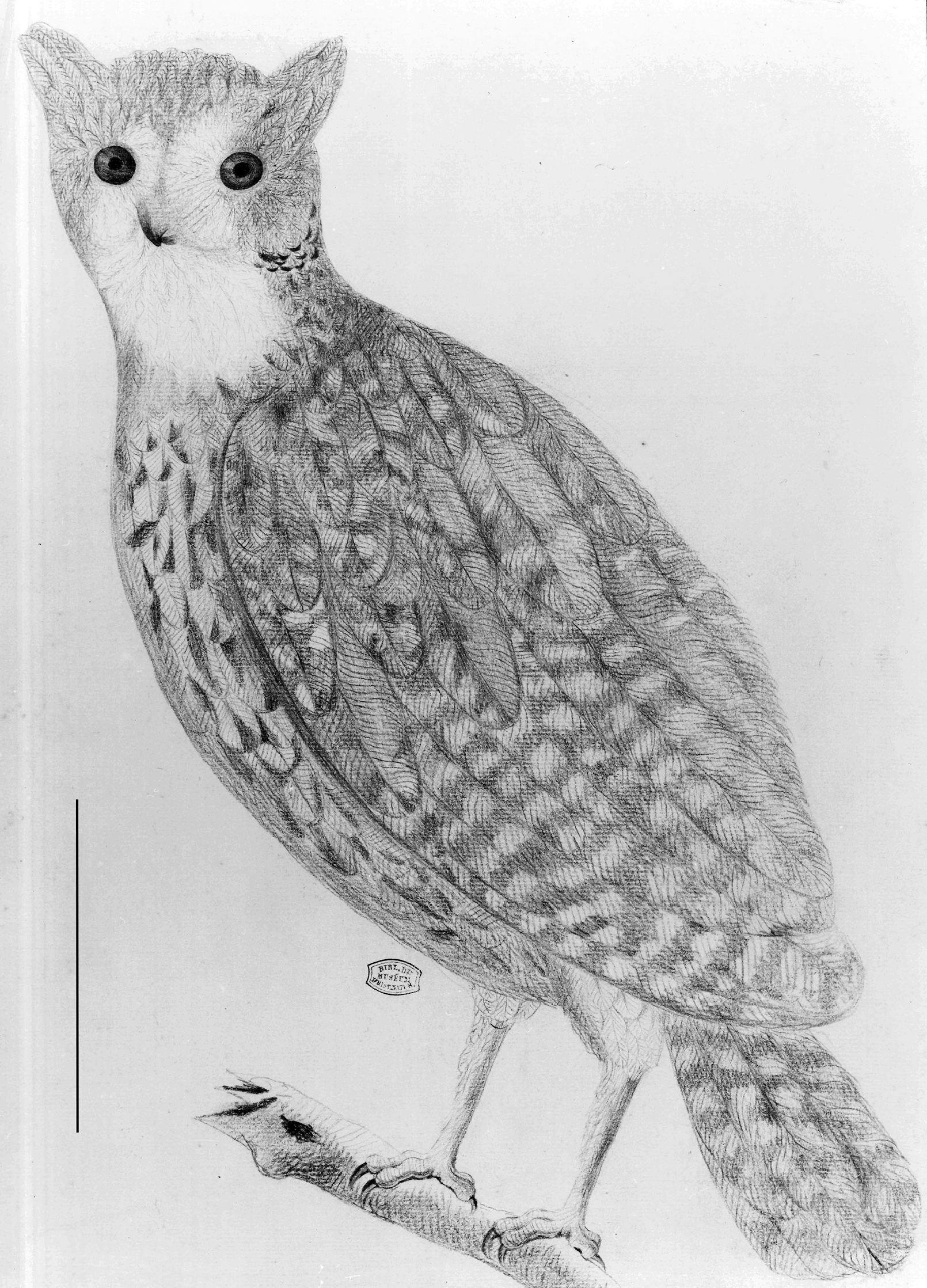
- Drawing of a specimen by Paul de Jossigny from c. 1770

Conservation status
- Extinct (by 1859) (IUCN 3.1)

Scientific classification
- Kingdom: Animalia
- Phylum: Chordata
- Class: Aves
- Order: Strigiformes
- Family: Strigidae
- Genus: Otus
- Species: †O. sauzieri

Binomial name
- †Otus sauzieri (Newton & Gadow, 1893)
- Location of Mauritius where this species lived

Synonyms
- List: Strix sauzieri Newton & Gadow, 1893; Scops commersoni Oustalet, 1896; Strix newtoni Rothschild, 1907; Tyto sauzieri Hachisuka, 1953; Tyto newtoni Hachisuka, 1953; Mascarenotus sauzieri (Newton & Gadow, 1893)

= Mauritius scops owl =

Extinct species of owl

The Mauritius scops owl (Otus sauzieri), also known as the Mauritius owl or Mauritius lizard owl, is an extinct species of scops owl that lived on the Mascarene island of Mauritius. Contemporary accounts of owls include mentions in 17th-century reports from Mauritius, a drawing made around 1770, and a detailed description of a killed specimen from 1837. After the owls had disappeared, subfossils were found in the Mare aux Songes swamp. These remains became the basis of the new species Strix sauzieri in 1893 and two other species were later named: Scops commersoni based on the drawing and description in 1896, and Strix newtoni based on a smaller fossil in 1907.

Later writers doubted whether three distinct owl species had lived on Mauritius, and concluded in 1994 that the known evidence represented a single species. It was placed in the new genus Mascarenotus along with the extinct owls of the two other Mascarene Islands, the Rodrigues scops owl and the Réunion scops owl. A 2018 ancient DNA study found the Mascarene owls to be derived from different lineages within the scops owl genus Otus that originated in Southeast Asia, therefore not constituting their own genus, leaving the Mauritian species as O. sauzieri.

Based on the contemporary accounts and subfossils, the Mauritius scops owl was a large owl with an average body length of 39.5 cm (15.6 in), larger than extant scops owls, and a wingspan of 59.4 cm (23.4 in). The wings were proportionally short and the legs were long. It had prominent brown ear-tufts and featherless tarsi. The upper parts of its plumage were brown and the rest was wholly or partially white. Its white eyebrows (or supercilia) and bristles were unique among the owl species in the Indian Ocean region. Its skull and eye sockets were small for its size.

Little is known about the behaviour of the Mauritius scops owl. Based on its long legs, it probably hunted lizards and small birds, like some other island owls. Its long legs and featherless tarsi indicate they were probably more terrestrial than other owls, and their proportionally small heads and eye sockets could indicate they were less nocturnal. The last two accounts based on observations state it had become scarce after formerly being plentiful, due to deforestation and poaching; it was gone by 1859. Researchers point to other extinction causes, including the effects of introduced animals, and the increased terrestriality of these owls could also have made them more vulnerable.

== Taxonomy ==
Early reports mentioned owls on the Mascarene island of Mauritius, the first being those of the Dutch sailors Willem van Westzanen in 1602 and Cornelis Matelief de Jonge in 1606, and of the British traveller Sir Thomas Herbert in 1627. No more owls were recorded until the French officer Paul de Jossigny illustrated several Mauritian specimens obtained by the French botanist Philibert Commerson around 1770, including the only known illustration a Mauritian owl. The French zoologist Julien Desjardins described a killed specimen in detail in 1837; his report and Jossigny's drawing were made widely known in 1896, after the owls had disappeared. The British ornithologist and Colonial Secretary for Mauritius Edward Newton mentioned in his diary that an owl skin was present at the Mauritius Institute until it was lost during a cyclone in 1870. It is uncertain whether this was the correct year or if a storm was the cause at all, and no skins of this species exist today.

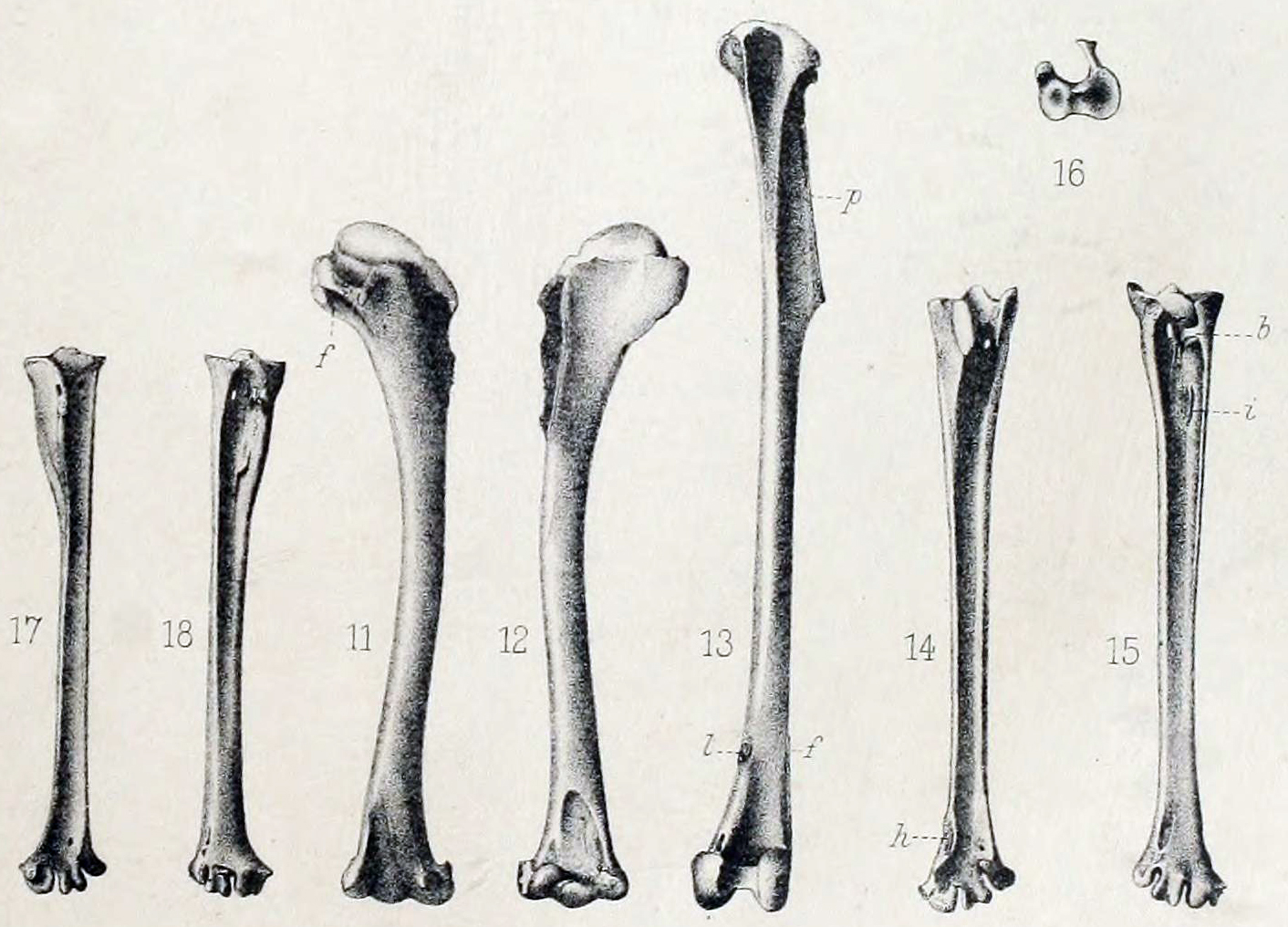
Subfossil remains described in 1893, including a humerus (11–12), tibia (13), and a large and small tarsometatarsus (14–16, 17–18); the latter was once thought to represent the distinct species Strix newtoni

In 1889, the Mauritian government requested exploration of the Mare aux Songes swamp for "historical souvenirs", where vast amounts of dodo remains had been found. The new excavations, under the direction of the French naturalist Théodore Sauzier, were successful; apart from dodo bones, subfossil remains of other extinct animals, including both previously known and new species, were found. These bones were sent to the Cambridge University Museum of Zoology, where they were examined and described by Newton and the German ornithologist Hans Gadow in 1893. Based on two humeri (upper arm bones), three tibiae (shinbones), and four tarsometatarsi (lower leg bones that fuse the ankle bones with the metatarsi of the feet), they determined the existence of an owl.

Newton and Gadow stated that owls are generally classified according to features of the skull, sternum, or external characters, none of which were available for this owl. They noted that the length of the tibia relative to that of the metatarsus is characteristic of various families and genera and indicated that the owl from Mauritius belonged to what they termed "long-footed owls"; typical members of this group are the short-eared owl (Strix flammea) and its relatives. The Mauritius owl differed from those owls in some proportions, so Newton and Gadow named it the new species Strix sauzieri. Although the largest metatarsi were 63–66 mm (2.5–2.6 in) long, a pair were shorter and slenderer than the others at 56 mm (2.2 in), yet also fully ossified (turned into hard bone). These writers did not feel the differences were due to age or sexual dimorphism. Unless the island possessed two Strix species, the smaller bones would have been from a small individual of the same species, although they found it unlikely that a species confined to a small island would range as much in size as the short-eared owl of Britain.

=== Naming of additional Mauritian owl species ===
In 1896, the French zoologist Émile Oustalet reported the discovery of a drawing by Jossigny c. 1770 in the Commerson collection in Paris depicting an owl from Mauritius. It appeared life-sized, roughly the same size as the marsh owl (Asio capensis) of Madagascar, but with different plumage. Oustalet did not think the drawing depicted the owls of earlier reports and fossils from Mauritius, which supposedly represented a barn owl without ear-tufts. Instead he considered it similar to a scops owl but much larger, and identical to the owl described in detail by Desjardins in a by-then-little-known 1837 report; the drawing matched the description and was the same size as that given. Desjardins had considered it a scops owl new to science, and stated it was killed in October 1836 in Anse des Bambous, Grand Port District, and sent to him barely gutted. He foresaw that the species would soon be extinct, which Oustalet confirmed, and expressed hope that bones or even a stuffed specimen would be discovered. Oustalet named the owl Scops commersoni as a tribute to Commerson, who had long remained unrecognised. He also found the Rodrigues owl (then Athene murivora), described from subfossils and descriptions from the Mascarene Island of Rodrigues in 1873, to be unrelated.

In 1907, the British zoologist Walter Rothschild stated that he did not believe Oustalet's Scops commersoni truly belonged to the genus Scops, being too large, but that it had to be left there due to the lack of physical specimens. Rothschild also considered the smaller owl mentioned by Newton and Gadow a new species, Strix newtoni, named after the by-then-late Newton. He noted that although those writers had not considered the smaller owl distinct, the short-eared owl co-occurs throughout much of its range with either the eastern grass owl (then Strix candida) or the African grass owl (then S. capensis). These species are popularly termed grass owls, which have longer legs than the true barn owls, to which the short-eared owl and its relatives belong. Rothschild suggested that two species of Strix owls co-occurred on Mauritius, S. sauzieri being the local representative of the grass owls and the smaller S. newtoni belonging to the barn owl.

The Japanese ornithologist Masauji Hachisuka recognised the three proposed Mauritius owl species in 1953, considering Rothschild's view justified by the fact that Mauritius had two species of flightless rails, two pigeons, and three parrots. He concluded that the features of Strix sauzieri were more consistent with the genus Tyto and assigned it and Strix newtoni there, and added there was no way to determine whether Scops commersoni did belong in Scops or in Tyto. He also listed common names for the species; Sauzier's grass owl for Tyto sauzieri, Newton's barn owl for Tyto newtoni, and Commerson's scops owl for Scops commersoni.

=== Synonymisation of species and naming of new genus ===
The American ornithologist James Greenway stated in 1967 that if enough bones were available, it would be apparent that the difference of 6 mm between Tyto sauzieri and Strix newtoni was due to individual variation rather than specific differences; he found it questionable there would have been two species of owls on Mauritius. He concurred with Rothschild that the size given for Scops commersoni was too large for a scops owl, and considered it more consistent with the genus Asio, perhaps being related to the Madagascar owl (Asio madagascariensis), but conceded that the unfeathered legs were more in line with scops owls.

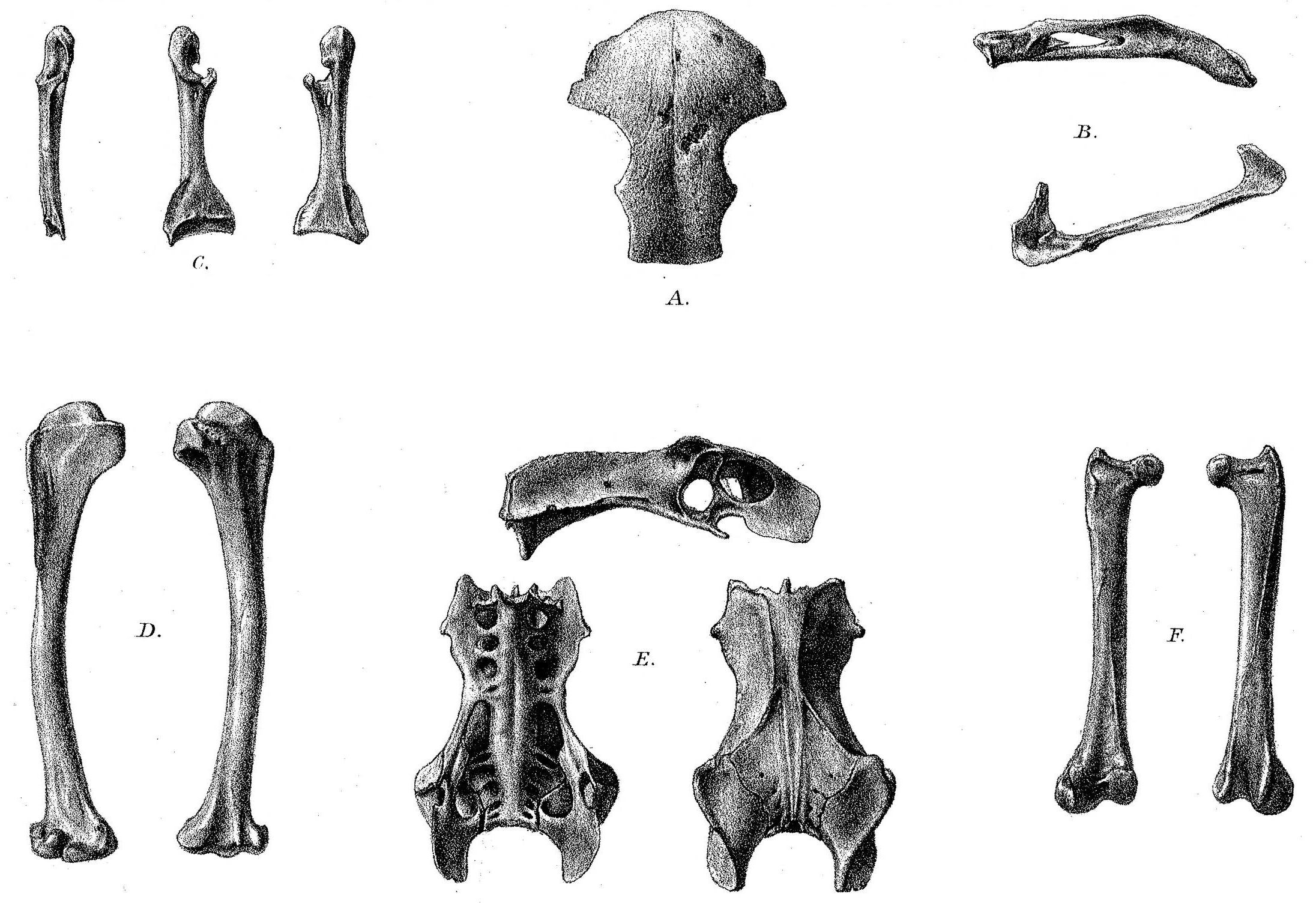
Subfossils of the Rodrigues scops owl, an extinct relative from Rodrigues

In 1987, the British ornithologist Anthony S. Cheke considered the owl described in the contemporary accounts to refer to Scops commersoni, which could possibly be a member of the genus Otus (by then the senior synonym of Scops), but found the T. sauzieri subfossils (including those of T. newtoni) to belong to a different genus. In the same book, the British ornithologist Graham S. Cowles stated that owl bones found on the Mascarene island of Réunion in 1974 showed that owls once inhabited all three Mascarene Islands. The bones from Réunion were so similar to those from Mauritius that he was unable to find osteological features that distinguished the two. He noted that the genus Strix now applied to the wood owls while Tyto were the barn owls, but that reexamination showed that sauzieri did not belong to that genus, and that the Mascarene owls were in need of their own, new genus, perhaps related to the genus Ninox. Cowles found that the pelves of the Mauritius owl and the Rodrigues owl (by then Tyto murivora) shared distinct features, suggesting a close relation between the two, but kept them as separate species since the former had longer and slimmer legs. In 1994, Cowles formally assigned the material from Réunion, consisting of limb bones, to S. sauzieri, expanding the range of the species.

In 1994, the French palaeontologist Cécile Mourer-Chauviré and colleagues coined the new genus Mascarenotus to contain the Mascarene owls, which they thought were probably derived from Otus scops owls. The generic name combines the name of the Mascarene Islands with that of the genus Otus, and S. sauzieri was designated the type species. They characterised the genus by its large size and elongated legs. These writers also considered Scops commersoni to represent the same species as M. sauzieri, as their size and features were consistent, concluding there was only one species of owl on Mauritius. They named the Réunion owl M. grucheti as its limb bones were very similar to those of the Mauritius owl but differed in some details. They found the Mascarene owls to have similar limb shape and dimensions to the extinct Grallistrix owls of Hawaii, probable adaptations to the same environmental conditions. Cheke and the British palaeontologist Julian P. Hume accepted the genus Mascarenotus for the Mascarene owls in 2008, calling them "lizard-owls". They noted that although their closest relatives among the scops owls were yet to be identified, they were so distinct among the group that they may have started diverging on older islands of a hot spot island chain, reaching Mauritius and Rodrigues from St. Brandon.

Remains of Mascarene owls are rare, but subfossils of the Mauritius species are housed at the Mauritius Institute, Port Louis (the type series described in 1893), Cambridge University Museum of Zoology, National Museum of Natural History in Paris, Natural History Museum at Tring, and Claude Bernard University Lyon 1. Subfossils were collected by Louis Étienne Thirioux, an amateur naturalist from Mauritius, around the turn of the 19th century from cave deposits around Le Pouce and Plaine des Roche, including material that was partially associated. Hume collected a complete pelvis in Kanaka Cave, Bois Cheri in 2007.

=== Genetics and evolution ===
A 2008 DNA study of Otus owls by Jérôme Fuchs and colleagues noted that the relationships between Mascarenotus and other owls were still unclear, and that they may have been a recent offshoot of the Otus colonisation process from the Seychelles to more westerly islands of the Indian Ocean, or possibly an unrelated lineage. In 2018, the French ornithologist Antoine Louchart and a team including Hume and Mourer-Chauviré examined ancient DNA of the three Mascarene owls to determine their relationship to extant owls, including Indian Ocean Otus species. Subfossil bones of the Mascarene owls were crushed to a powder for analysis, but no DNA sequence could be obtained for the Réunion species. The resulting cladogram showed that the Mauritius scops owl was the sister species of the Karthala scops owl (Otus pauliani) from Grand Comoro and the Madagascar scops owl (O. rutilus) from Madagascar, whereas the Rodrigues scops owl grouped with other species, as shown below:

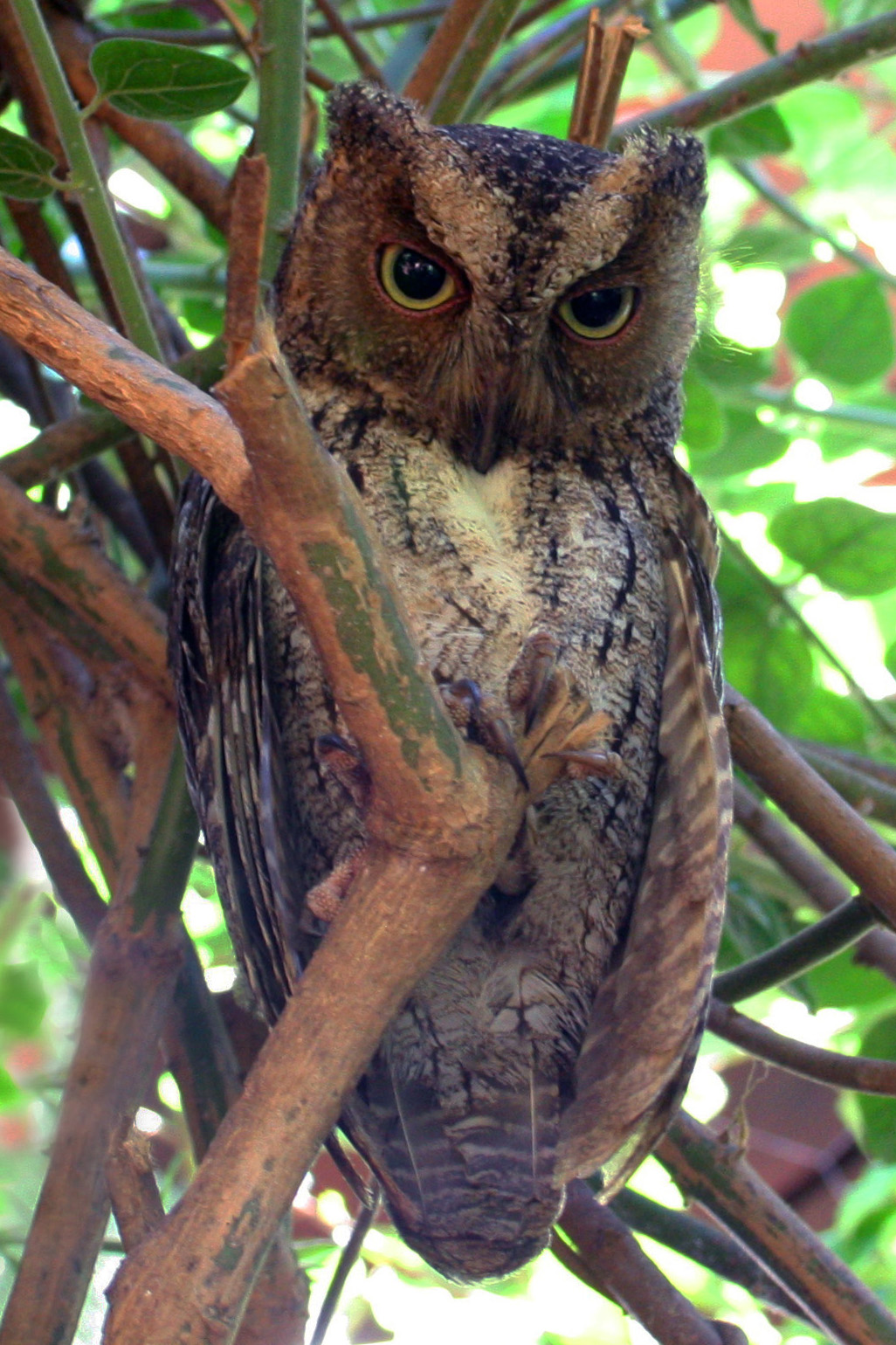
The Madagascar scops owl is a close genetic relative

- - - Otus mirus (Mindanao scops owl)
    - Otus longicornis (Luzon scops owl)
  - - Otus murivorus (Rodrigues scops owl)
    - Otus capnodes (Anjouan scops owl)
    - Otus moheliensis (Moheli scops owl)
    - Otus mayottensis (Mayotte scops owl)
    - - Otus insularis (Seychelles scops owl)
      - Otus sunia (oriental scops owl)
    - - Otus sauzieri (Mauritius scops owl)
      - Otus pauliani (Karthala scops owl)
      - Otus rutilus (Madagascar scops owl)

Based on these results, Louchart and colleagues suggested that the ancestor of the oriental scops owl (O. sunia) colonised Rodrigues, Madagascar and part of the Comoros from southeast Asia more than three million years ago; later, new lineages presumably from Madagascar, colonised Grand Comoro and Mauritius, evolving into the Mauritius scops owl on the latter. The colonisations were probably aided by cyclonic events during the Pliocene (by dispersing birds), that were more severe than today. Most other Mascarene birds, including the dodo, are also thought to have a southeast Asian origin. The owls of Mauritius and Rodrigues therefore independently evolved similar features such as gigantism (a result of feeding on larger prey), reduction of their wings (due to becoming more terrestrial on small, isolated islands without major mammalian predators), and a relative decrease in the size of their skulls and eyes (perhaps due to a less nocturnal lifestyle).

Louchart and colleagues considered the genus Mascarenotus an unnatural paraphyletic grouping, and assigned the three Mascarene species to Otus alongside their genetic relatives. The plumage of the Mauritius scops owl had a mixture of various features seen in its ancestral lineage and close species, as well as unique features, a variable mixture indicating complex and rapid evolution of plumage features with wide homoplasy (similar features independently developed in separate lineages) among the studied species. Though the Mauritius species clearly had prominent ear-tufts based on its description and drawing (more so than its continental ancestor), these writers speculated that the one on Rodrigues did not, since one account referred to it by a name used for ear-less European owls (several insular scops owl species have evolved reduced ear-tufts). This article was also the first time Jossigny's drawing of the Mauritius scops owl was published in high resolution.

== Description ==
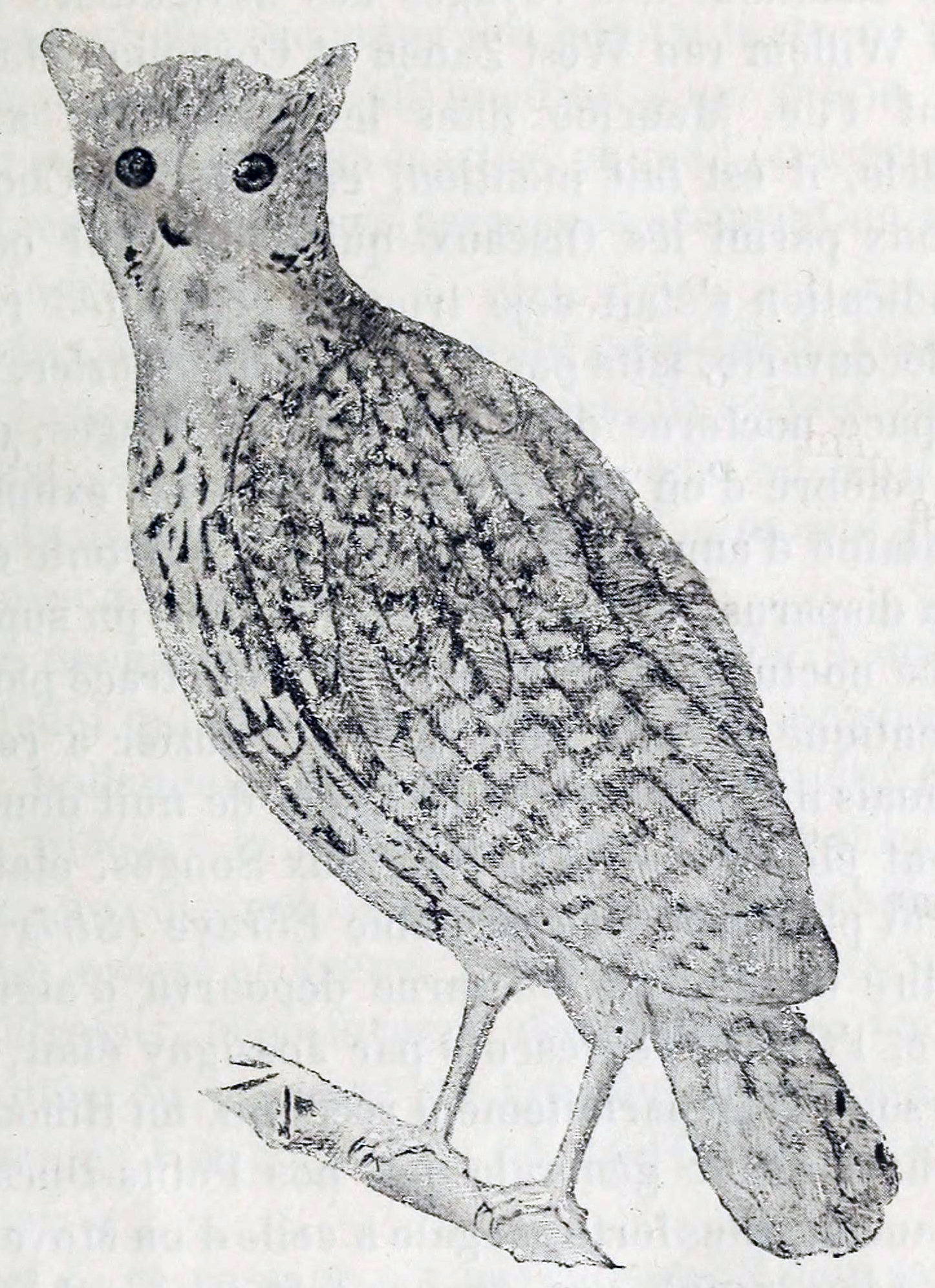
1896 reproduction of Jossigny's drawing by Émile Oustalet; a high resolution version of the original was only published in 2018

Unlike the other Mascarene owls, the external features of the Mauritius scops owl were recorded in detail, owing to Desjardins' description and Jossigny's drawing, which are still valuable for characterising the species. It was a large owl, with a body length of 36.5–42 cm (14.4–16.5 in), or an average of 39.5 cm (15.6 in), extrapolated from subfossils. This increased size was shared by the three Mascarene owls, whereas other Otus owls are smaller, with the largest extant species, the giant scops owl (O. gurneyi), reaching 30–35 cm (12–14 in). According to Desjardins, the wingspan of the Mauritius species was 59.4 cm (23.4 in), the wings were proportionally short and round, and the legs were long.

The Mauritius scops owl had prominent, brown ear-tufts and featherless tarsi (the part between the ankle and the toes). The upper parts of the plumage were dark brown and the feathers of the head, neck and back had rufous edges. The tail was rufous-brown and was marbled with rufous. The wings were brown with irregular white, pale buff, and brown bands. The throat and sides of the body were whitish, and the rest of the underparts were dark buff with whitish spots. Its white eyebrows (or supercilia) and bristles were unique among the owl species in the Indian Ocean region. The beak and feet were rusty brown and described as "strong".

Based on the average of several Mauritius scops owl specimens, the humerus was 67.1 mm (2.64 in) long, the ulna 79.3 mm (3.12 in), the carpometacarpus (part of the hand) 37.1 mm (1.46 in), the femur 55.5 mm (2.19 in), the tibiotarsus (lower leg bone that fuses the tibia with ankle bones) 85.2 mm (3.35 in), and the tarsometatarsus 60.8 mm (2.39 in) long. Mourer-Chauviré compared the known bones of the Mauritius scops owl to those of the Réunion scops owl, finding them close in size; the only humerus known from Réunion was smaller. The ratios of the Mauritius scops owl's bones were very similar to those of extant insular species such as the bare-legged owl (Margarobyas lawrencii) and the Puerto Rican owl (Gymnasio nudipes) from the Caribbean, whose legs are much longer than in continental relatives. Based on the fossils and Jossigny's drawing, Louchart and colleagues suggested in 2018 that the Mauritius and Rodrigues scops owls had small skulls and eye sockets in proportion to their body size; in the case of the Mauritius species, some rear skull dimensions were only 1.0–1.25 times larger than in the Eurasian scops owl (O. scops), while the rest of the skeleton was ca. 1.7 times larger.

== Behaviour and ecology ==
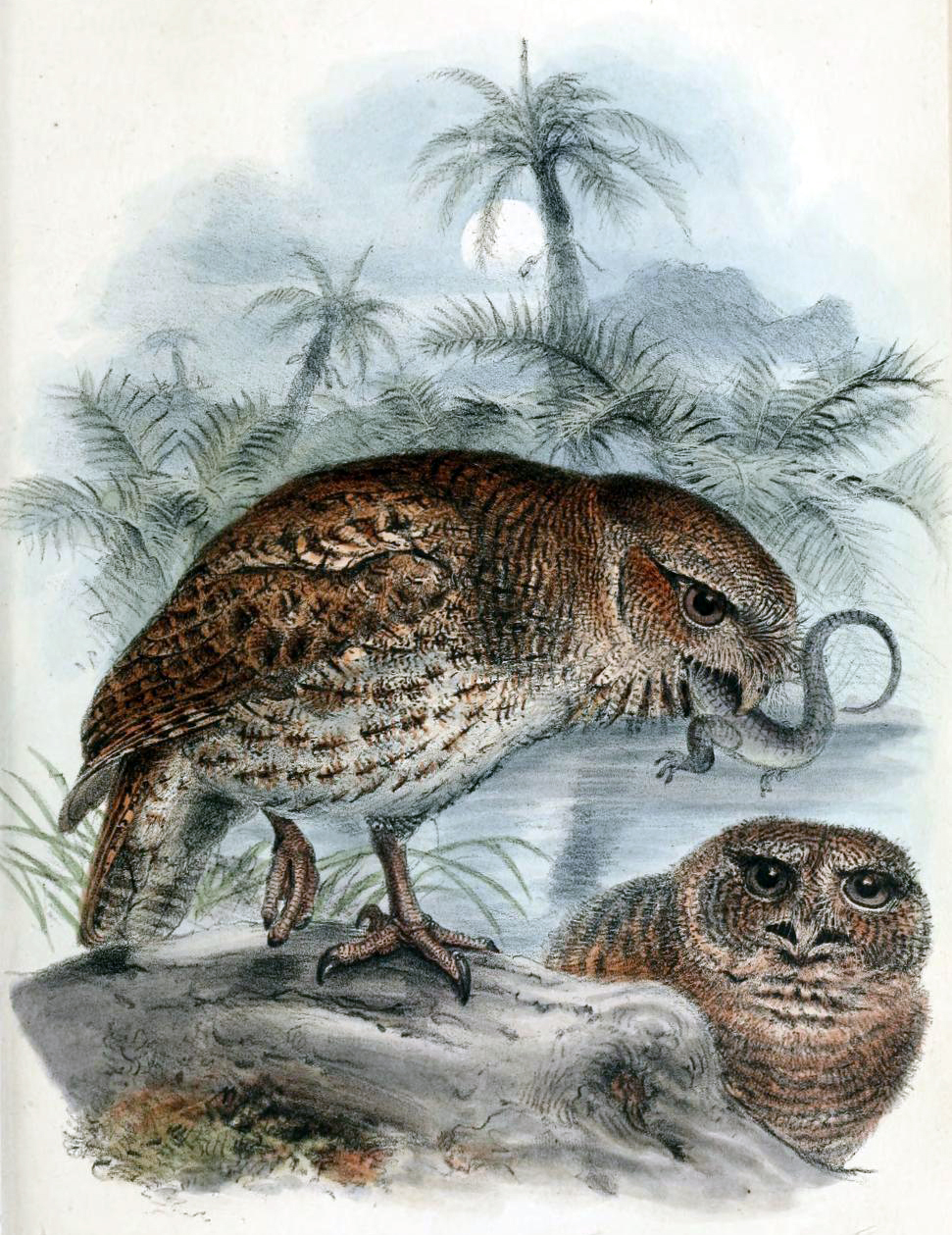
The long legs of this species have been compared to those of insular Caribbean owls such as the Puerto Rican owl, here depicted feeding on a lizard, as the Mauritius species probably also did

Nothing was recorded about the habits of the Mauritius scops owl. It was one of three birds of prey on Mauritius, and these probably occurred in all forest types. Mourer-Chauviré and colleagues pointed out in 1994 that in the two Caribbean owl species, long legs correlate with catching birds on islands where mammals are absent, and that the Mascarene owls could therefore have hunted similar prey. Cheke and Hume stated in 2008 that lizards were probably more abundant and easier to catch in the Mascarene Islands, and that the large size and long legs of the owls suggest they preyed on terrestrial lizards, probably forest skinks such as Telfair’s skink and the Macchabé skink, and perhaps small birds. The French sailor Julien Tafforet specifically stated in 1726 that the Rodrigues scops owl fed on small birds and lizards. Louchart and colleagues added in 2018 that as well as very large local skinks and geckos and occasional small or medium-sized birds, the owls probably also fed on introduced animals such as rats after humans arrived.

Hume suggested in 2013 that the owl may have required large trees for nesting and roosting; Tafforet described similar behaviour for the Rodrigues species. Because of their very long legs, Louchart and colleagues suggested in 2018 that the Mauritius and Réunion scops owls could have become so terrestrial that they nested on the ground, but considered it unlikely, as contemporary accounts indicate they spent most of their time in trees. The nearly featherless tarsi of the Mauritius species may also be related to more terrestrial habits. These researchers also suggested that the proportionally small heads and eye sockets of the Mauritius and Rodrigues species could be due to a less nocturnal and more diurnal lifestyle, which would be unique among island owls. The lesser horned owl (Bubo magellanicus) also has a relatively small head which may be connected to diurnal habits in some of its populations. A 2020 X-ray microtomography study of the inner ear of the Rodrigues scops owl by the French palaeontologist Anaïs Duhamel and colleagues suggested some level of terrestrialisation and sedentarisation, supported by the reduction of the wings in this and the other Mascarene owls. Its sense of smell was better than in its extant relatives, which could indicate partial scavenging habits, and its more sideways-facing eyes, smaller brain, fearlessness, less upright posture, and increased size are consistent with specialisation for an isolated island.

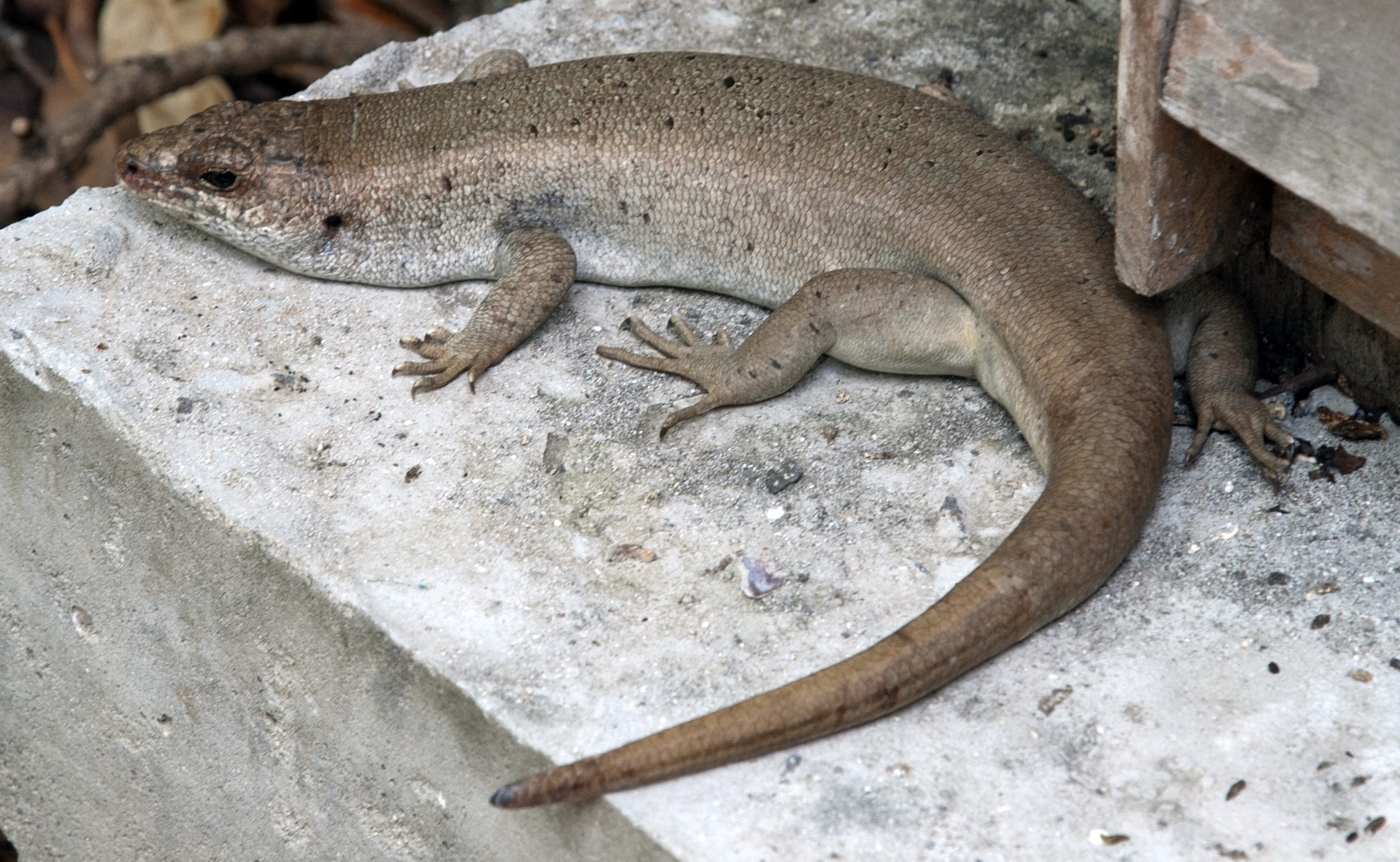
Lizards such as Telfair’s skink were probably among the prey of this owl

Many other endemic species of Mauritius were lost after the arrival of humans, so that the ecosystems of the island are severely damaged and hard to conserve. Before humans arrived, the island was entirely covered in forests, very little of which remains today because of deforestation. The surviving endemic fauna is still seriously threatened. The Mauritius scops owl lived alongside other recently extinct Mauritian birds such as the dodo, the red rail, the Mauritius sheldgoose, the Mascarene teal, the broad-billed parrot, the Mascarene grey parakeet, the Mauritius blue pigeon, the Mascarene coot, and the Mauritius night heron. Extinct Mauritian reptiles include the saddle-backed Mauritius giant tortoise, the domed Mauritius giant tortoise, the Mauritian giant skink, and the Round Island burrowing boa. The small Mauritian flying fox and the snail Tropidophora carinata lived on Mauritius and Réunion but became extinct in both islands. Some plants, such as Casearia tinifolia and the palm orchid, have also become extinct.

== Extinction ==
The last two accounts based on observations of the Mauritius scops owl provide some insight into its disappearance. Desjardins reported in 1837 that:

In September 1837 several inhabitants of the Savanne area told me they had seen owls in their forests; Dr Dobson, of the 99th Regiment, assured me he had killed one in the woods of Curepipe. It could well happen that in a few years, the species, if it is one, will have disappeared completely because of the destruction of our forests, and the large number of poachers who roam the woods that remain.

The naturalist George Clark, who worked at a school in Mahébourg, not far from Grand Port where the last known Mauritius scops owl was collected, wrote in 1859 that the bird was extinct though formerly plentiful:

A species of horned owl existed here as lately as the beginning of the century, and was tolerably plentiful in the woods, but I believe there are no more remaining. I have no means of ascertaining whether they were indigenous, or introduced from Madagascar, where a species which perfectly answers the description is plentiful, I incline to the latter opinion, believing it more likely that a few should have been introduced, and that they should after a time have been destroyed, than that an indigenous bird, which breeds as fast as the owl is known to do, should have disappeared. Mr. Dalais, who was an experienced hunter at the beginning of the present century, and who is still able to enjoy field sports, told me that he shot several in his youth; and from his description of them they must have been very much like the greater horned owl of England. The destruction of these birds is much to be regretted, as they would have done good service in helping to keep down the rats.

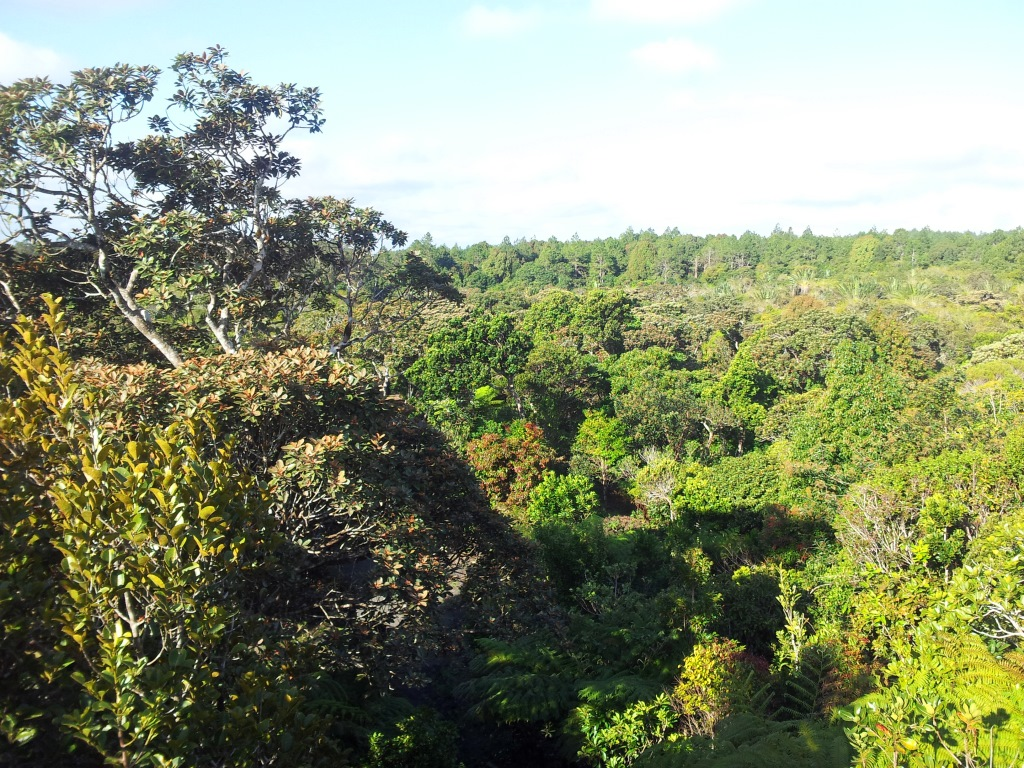
Indigenous forest canopy in Monvert Nature Park located in Curepipe, where an owl was reportedly killed

In 1987, Cheke stated that more than half of the trees of Mauritius were felled between 1835 and 1846, which may have coincided with the disappearance of the Mauritius scops owl. He also stated that monkeys introduced to the island could have been another factor, but that the disappearance of the owls and other species at this time cannot be attributed to a single cause. Cheke and Hume speculated in 2008 that the owl would have difficulty obtaining skinks, whose populations were decimated by introduced rats, house shrews, and tenrecs. The owl may therefore already have been threatened by the time massive deforestation began, and, perhaps like its kin on Rodrigues and Réunion, could not adapt to new prey items, or too many nest sites were destroyed by deforestation.

Hume and the British ornithologist Michael Walters stated in 2012 that the owl probably disappeared due to deforestation, as it had survived alongside introduced predators for centuries by then. Cheke added in 2013 that the many poachers mentioned by Desjardins could also have contributed. Louchart and colleagues suggested in 2018 that if the Mauritius and Réunion scops owls were mainly terrestrial, this would have made them more vulnerable to humans and their accompanying animals, explaining their quick disappearance.
