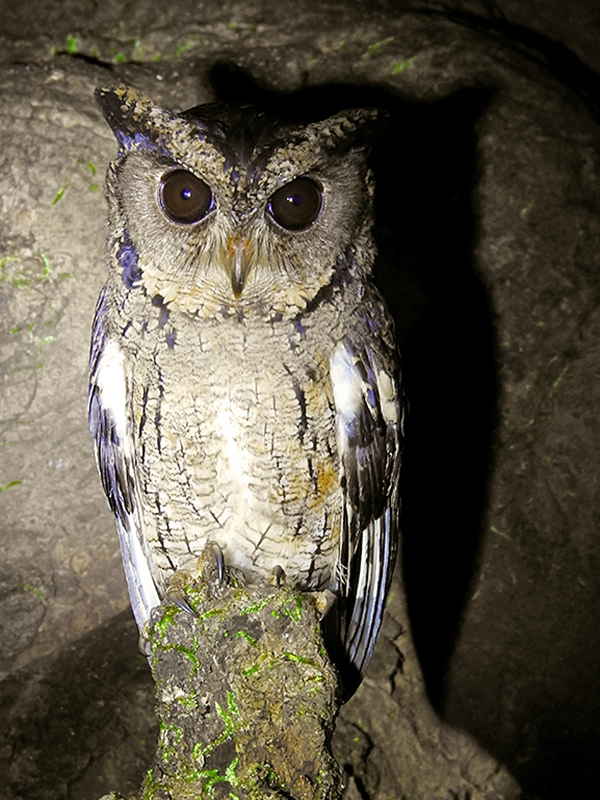
- In Maharashtra

Conservation status
- Least Concern (IUCN 3.1)
- CITES Appendix II

Scientific classification
- Kingdom: Animalia
- Phylum: Chordata
- Class: Aves
- Order: Strigiformes
- Family: Strigidae
- Genus: Otus
- Species: O. bakkamoena

Binomial name
- Otus bakkamoena Pennant, 1769

= Indian scops owl =

Species of owl

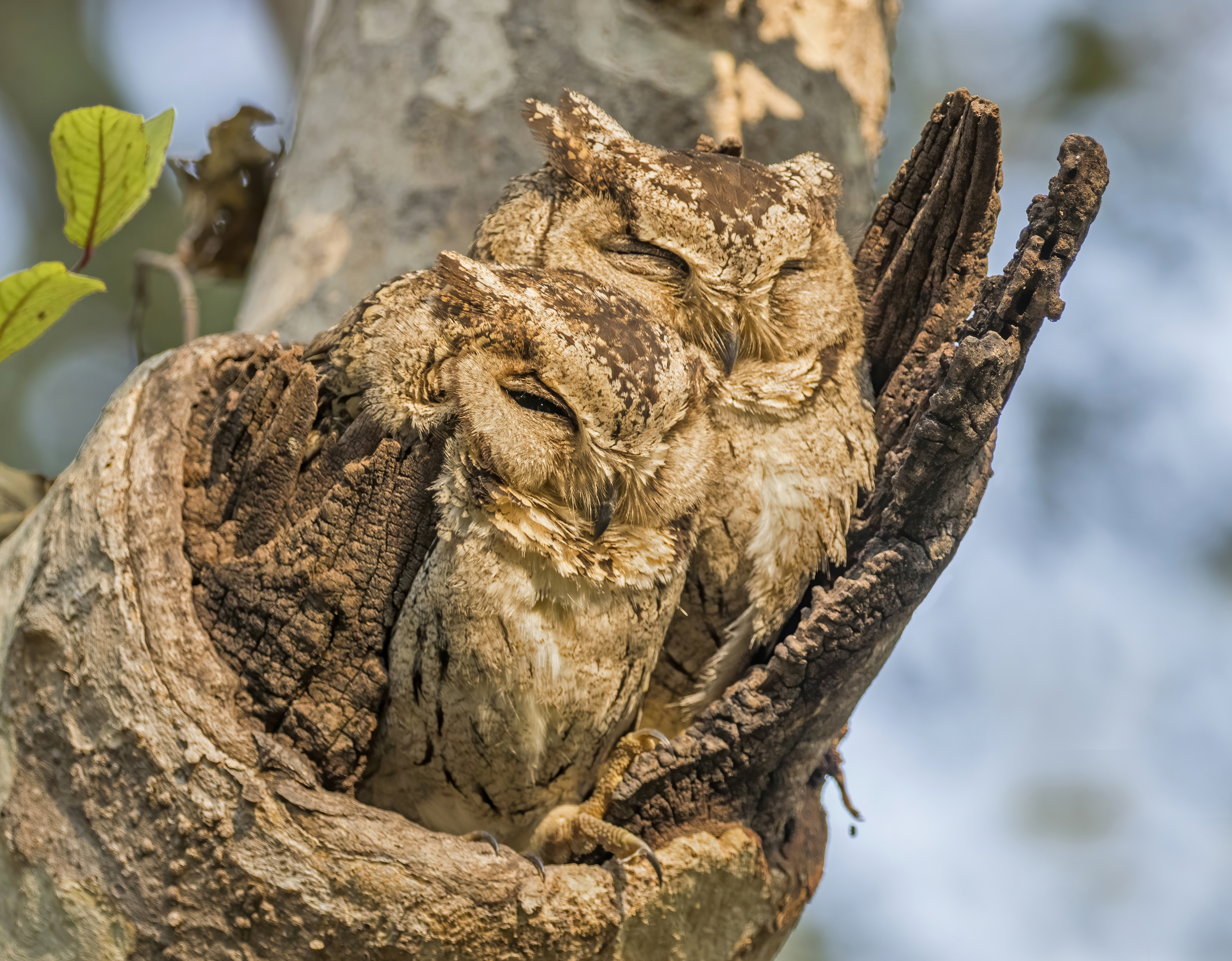
Pair, male on right

The Indian scops owl (Otus bakkamoena) is a species of owl native to South Asia.

== Taxonomy and etymology ==
This species formerly included the collared scops owl (Otus lettia). The species epithet is derived from "bakamuna", the Sinhalese name for the eastern barn owl (Tyto javanica), and the brown fish owl (Ketupa zeylonensis).

== Description ==
The Indian scops owl is a small 23–25 cm (9.1–9.8 in) owl, although it is one of the largest of the scops owls. Like other scops owls, it has small head tufts, or ears. The upperparts are grey or brown, depending on the morph, with faint buff spotting. The underparts are buff with fine darker streaking. The facial disc is whitish or buff, and the eyes are orange or brown. There is a buff neckband. Sexes are similar. The flight is deeply undulating.

This species is very similar to the slightly larger partially migratory collared scops owl (Otus lettia) and the oriental scops owl (Otus sunia). They can be separated on call and eye colour.

== Distribution and habitat ==
The species occurs from eastern Arabia through the Indian subcontinent, except the far north.

== Ecology ==
The Indian scops owl is nocturnal. Through its natural camouflage, it is very difficult to see in daytime, but may sometimes be located by the small birds that mob it while it is roosting in a tree. It feeds mainly on insects. The call is a soft single note ("whuk?"). It nests in tree cavities, laying 3–5 eggs.
