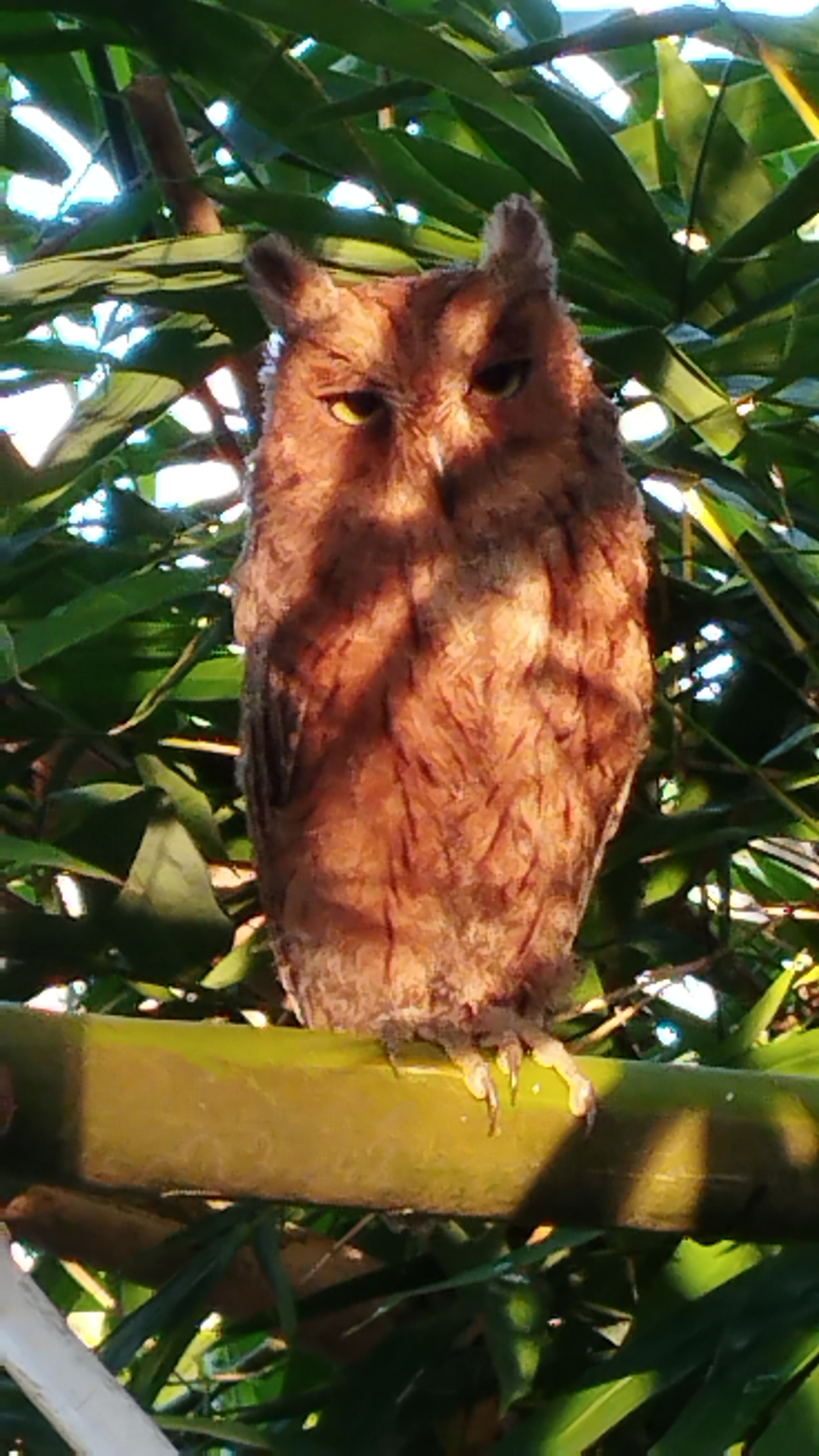
- rarer russet form

Conservation status
- Least Concern (IUCN 3.1)
- CITES Appendix II

Scientific classification
- Kingdom: Animalia
- Phylum: Chordata
- Class: Aves
- Order: Strigiformes
- Family: Strigidae
- Genus: Otus
- Species: O. mayottensis

Binomial name
- Otus mayottensis Benson, 1960
- Approximate distribution map Year-round

= Mayotte scops owl =

Species of owl

The Mayotte scops owl (Otus mayottensis) is a species of owl in the family Strigidae. It is endemic to the island of Mayotte in the Comoros.

== Taxonomy ==
The Mayotte scops owl has been considered to be conspecific with the Pemba scops owl (O. pembaensis), the Anjouan scops owl (O. capnodes), the rainforest scops owl and the Torotoroka scops owl (O. madagascariensis under O. rutilus), but this species has now been split and the Mayotte scops owl is now regarded as its own species, mainly based on its very different call. The scops owls of Madagascar, Comoros and Seychelles form a clade within the genus Otus with the Oriental scops owl (O. sunia) and are not closely related to the continental African scops owls.

== Description ==
The Mayotte scops owl is very similar to the rainforest scops owl (O. rutilus) with which it was once considered conspecific. The upperparts are plain brown marked with faint light spots while the underparts are paler brown than the upperparts. The facial disk is also brownish with a contrasting darker rim restricted to just the sides and not seen above the eyes. The crown is brown with darker streaks and the flanks are more reddish-brown with short dark streaks. The eyes are yellow. The body length is 20–22 cm (7.9–8.7 in).

=== Voice ===
The call of the Mayotte scops owl is a series of 3–11 deep, single hoots.

== Distribution and habitat ==
It is endemic to Maore island in Mayotte, where it is common and widespread. The habitat of the Mayotte scops owl is subtropical or tropical moist lowland forests.

== Status ==
The population of the Mayotte scops owl is thought to be stable as there is no evidence for any decline or of any substantial threats, thus it is categorised as least concern.
