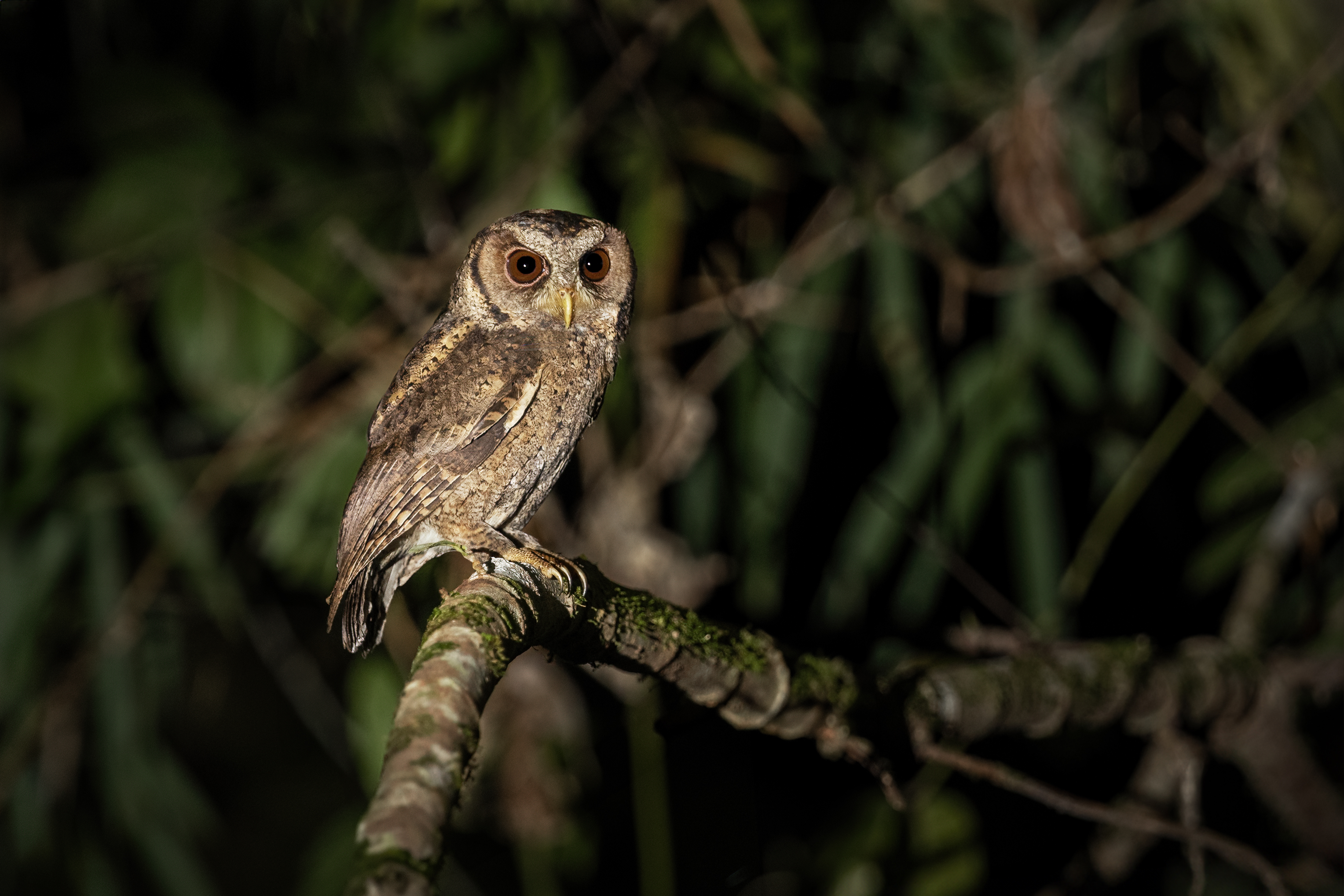

Conservation status
- Least Concern (IUCN 3.1)
- CITES Appendix II

Scientific classification
- Kingdom: Animalia
- Phylum: Chordata
- Class: Aves
- Order: Strigiformes
- Family: Strigidae
- Genus: Otus
- Species: O. lettia

Binomial name
- Otus lettia (Hodgson, 1836)

= Collared scops owl =

Species of owl

Call of a collared scops owl

The collared scops owl (Otus lettia) is an owl which is a resident breeder in south Asia from northern Pakistan, northern India, Nepal, Bangladesh, the Himalayas east to southern China, and Taiwan. It is partially migratory, with some birds wintering in India, Sri Lanka and Malaysia. This species was formerly considered to be included within what is now separated as the Indian scops owl (O. bakkamoena).

This species is a part of the larger grouping of owls known as typical owls, Strigidae, which contains most species of owl. The other grouping is the barn owls, Tytonidae.

The collared scops owl is a common breeding bird in forests and other well-wooded areas. It nests in tree hollows, laying 3-5 eggs.

The collared scops owl is a small (23–25 cm) owl, although it is the largest of the scops owls. Like other scops owls, it has small head tufts, or ears. The upperparts are grey or brown, depending on the subspecies, with faint buff spotting. The underparts are buff with fine darker streaking.

The facial disc is whitish or buff, and the eyes are orange or brown. There is a buff neckband. Sexes are similar. The flight is deeply undulating.

This species is nocturnal but it can often be located by the small birds that mob it while it is roosting in a tree. It feeds mainly on insects. The call is a quiet goog gook.

This species is chiefly found in northern India and is replaced by the very similar looking oriental scops owl (Otus sunia, recently split) towards the south of its range. It is also very similar to the slightly smaller Indian scops owl. They are most easily separated in the field by their calls. It is sometimes considered as a sub-species of the Indian scops owl.

== Gallery ==
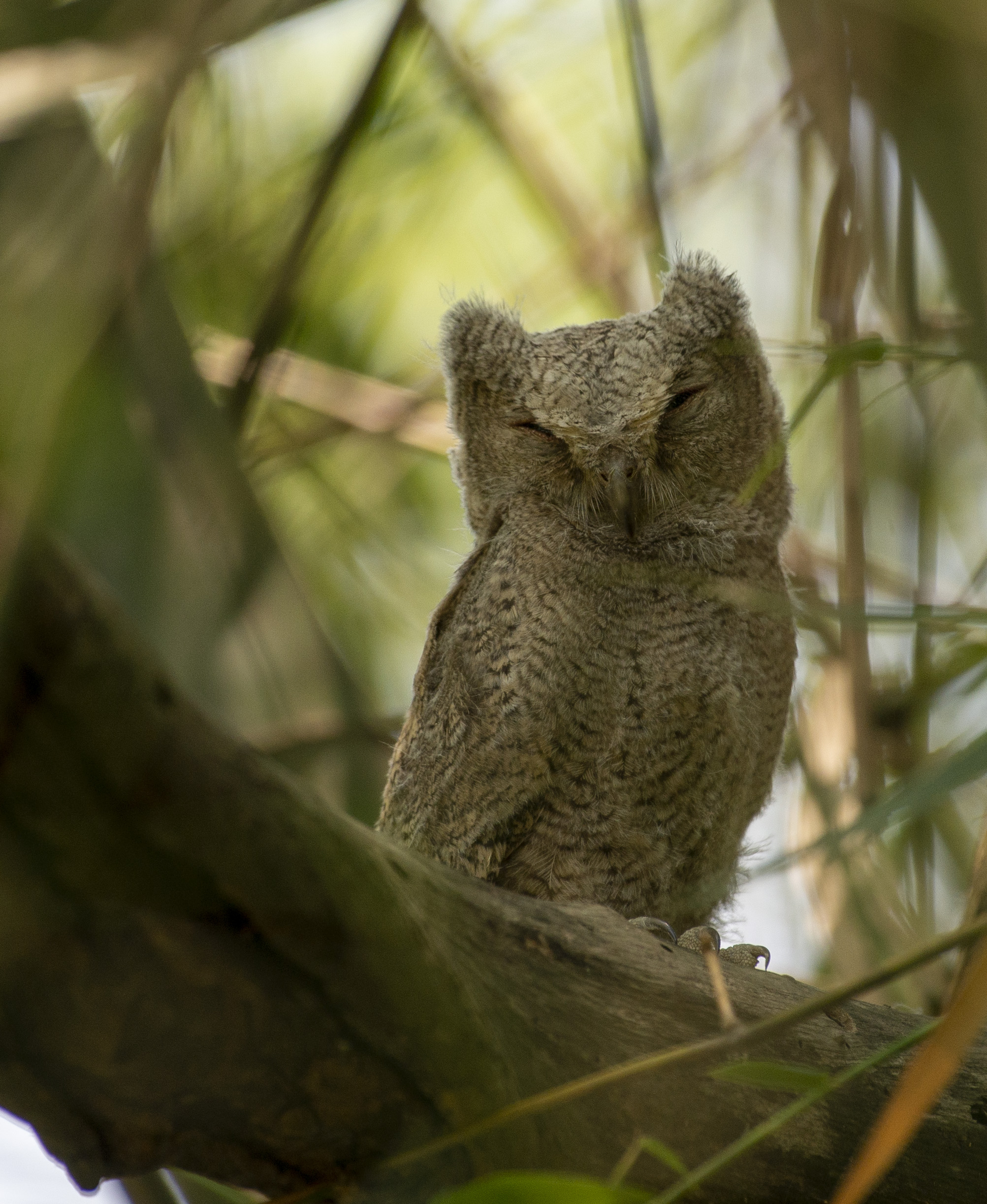
Juvenile in Nepal

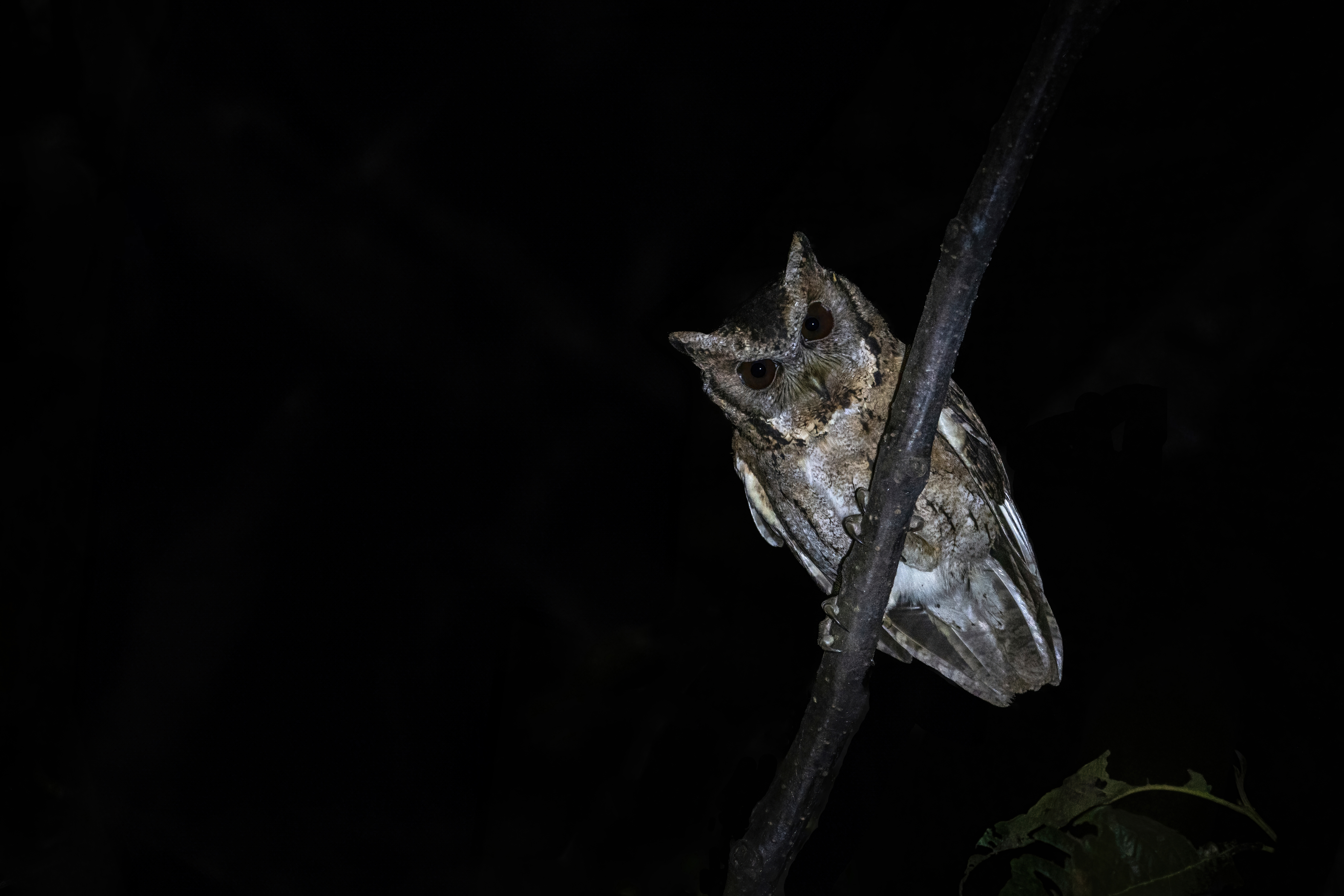
At Neelbarahi Bhaktapur, Nepal

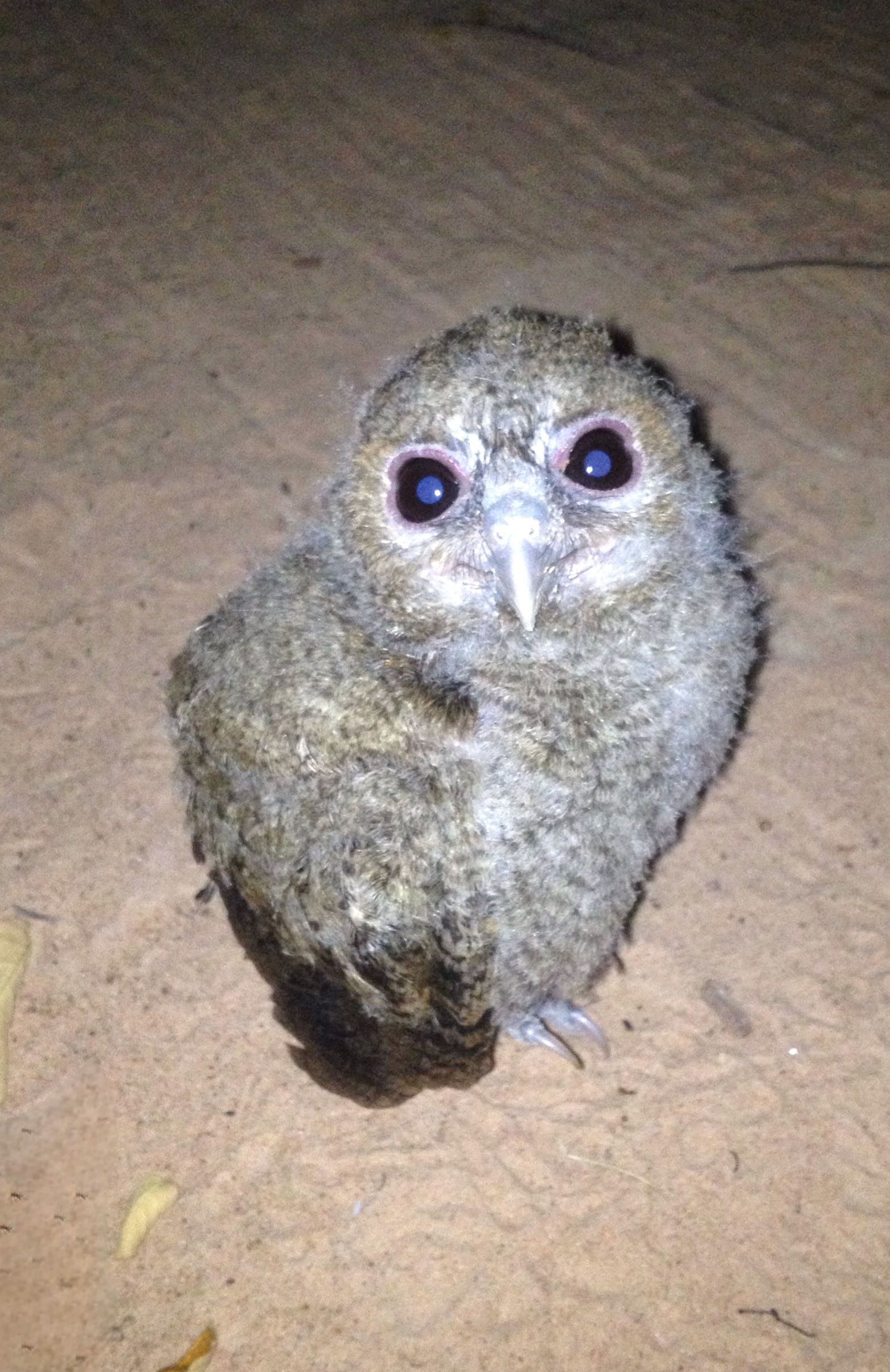
Juvenile in the Roi Et province, Thailand
