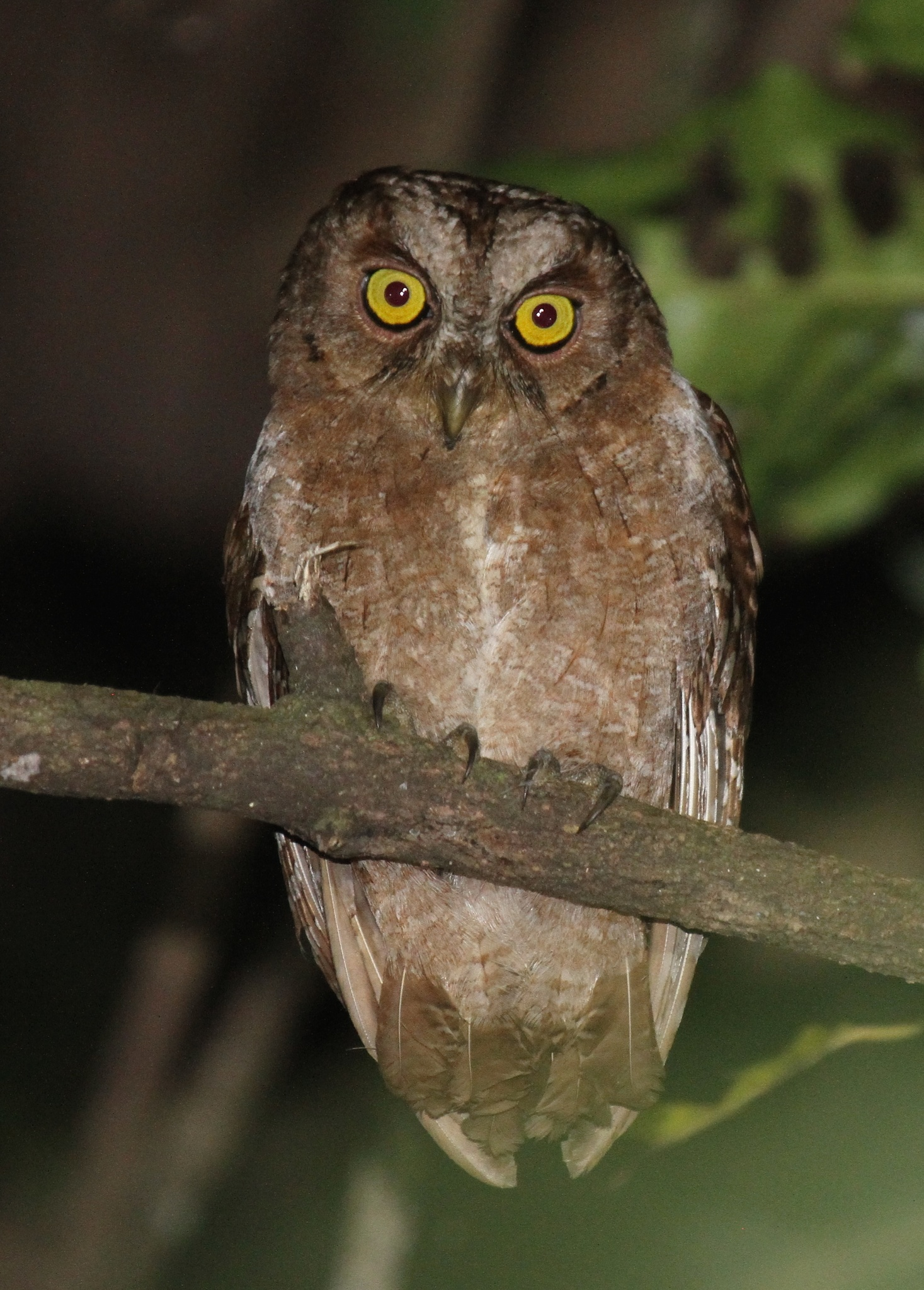
- in Tanzania

Conservation status
- Vulnerable (IUCN 3.1)
- CITES Appendix II

Scientific classification
- Kingdom: Animalia
- Phylum: Chordata
- Class: Aves
- Order: Strigiformes
- Family: Strigidae
- Genus: Otus
- Species: O. pembaensis

Binomial name
- Otus pembaensis Pakenham, 1937

= Pemba scops owl =

Species of owl

The Pemba scops owl (Otus pembaensis) is a species of owl in the family Strigidae. It is endemic to Pemba Island which is part of and off the coast of Tanzania.

== Taxonomy ==
The Pemba scops owl was formerly regarded as a subspecies of the Madagascar scops owl, Otus rutilus sensu lato, due to morphological similarities but genetic research has shown that it is closer to the clade in which the African scops owl, Otus senegalensis, is situated.

== Description ==
The Pemba scops owl is a medium-sized scops-owl with short ear-tufts. There are two colour morphs, a brown morph which is mainly pale rufous-brown with light streaking on the head and faint barring on paler underparts and a rufous morph which is a bright, rich rufous, that is paler on the underwing coverts. Both morphs show a pale scapular band, whitish in the brown morph and pale rufous in the rufous morph. The bill is black while the cere is greenish-yellow and the eyes and legs are yellow. It is 15 cm (5.9 in) tall with a 45 cm (18 in) wingspan.

=== Voice ===
The call is a single "hoo" note which is made at irregular intervals or in a vast rapid series of 4–6 notes given at intervals of half a second. The pair duets with the male calls being shorter, and lower in pitch.

== Distribution and habitat ==
The Pemba scops owl is endemic to Pemba, the northern island of the Zanzibar archipelago, part of Tanzania, off the coast of east Africa. On Pemba this owl is found in all wooded habitats from native forest to overgrown plantations of cloves and mango. However, it is most common in native forest.

== Behaviour ==
The biology of the Pemba scops owl is little known. It is nocturnal and roosts among foliage or in dense undergrowth during the day. It starts calling soon after sunset and then hunts. Its diet is mainly insects which may be caught in flight, gleaned from leaves or caught on the ground after a short glide from a perch. The breeding behaviour is almost unknown, although it possibly breeds from August to October and nests in natural holes in trees.

== Conservation status ==
The Pemba scops owl is listed as a Vulnerable by the IUCN because it is restricted to Pemba, the population continues to decline and there is a loss of habitat as local farmers clear plantations to make way for open agricultural fields. It is now largely confined to the two small remaining native forests: Ngezi, which is 14 km^{2} (5.4 sq mi) in area, and Msitu Mkuu, at only 3 km^{2} (1.2 sq mi). As of 2025, the population is estimated to be between 2,500 and 3,000 mature individuals, and is believed to be in rapid decline.
