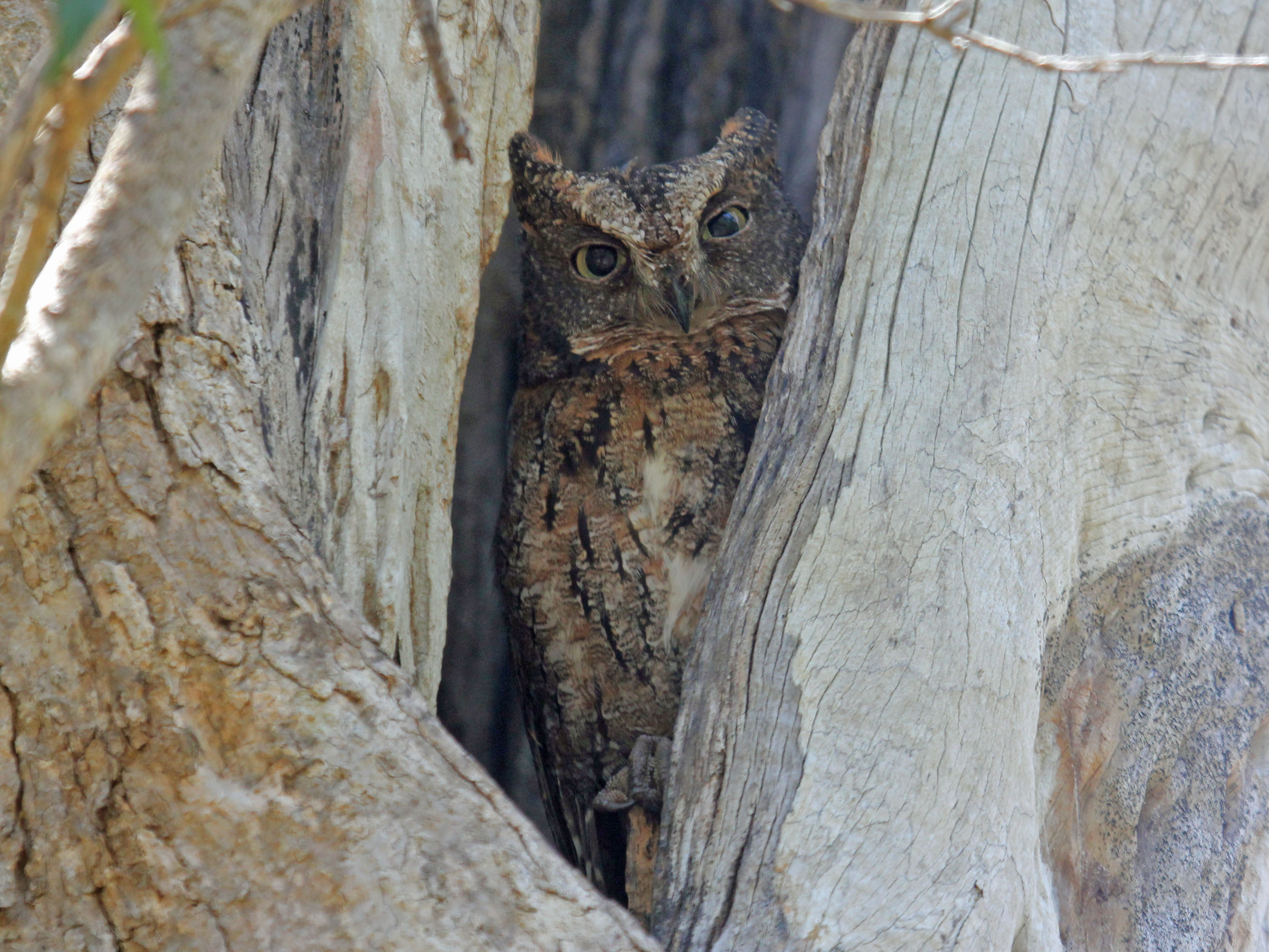
- Kirindy Forest, Madagascar
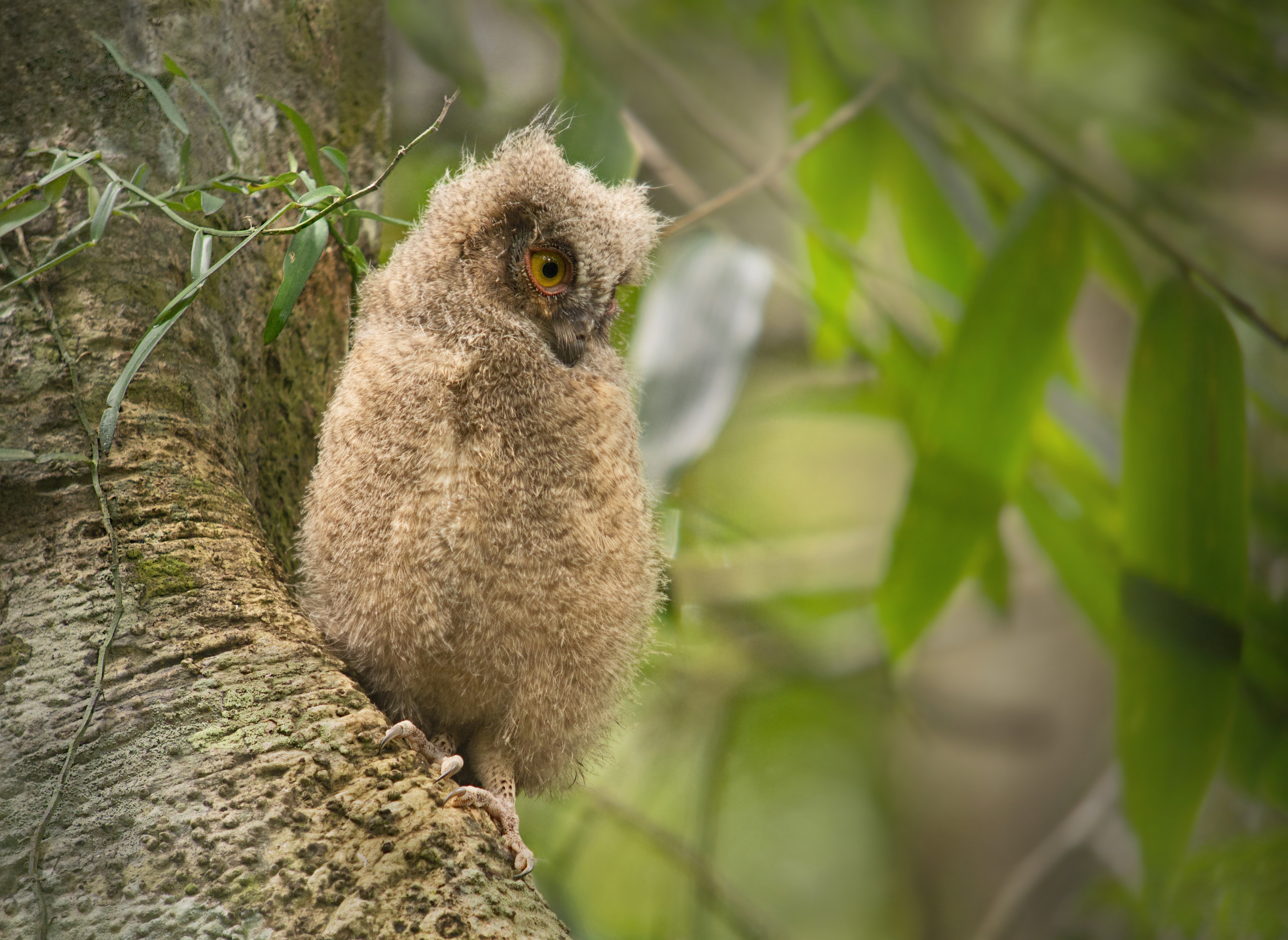
- Juvenile at Andasibe, Madagascar

Conservation status
- Least Concern (IUCN 3.1)
- CITES Appendix II

Scientific classification
- Kingdom: Animalia
- Phylum: Chordata
- Class: Aves
- Order: Strigiformes
- Family: Strigidae
- Genus: Otus
- Species: O. rutilus

Binomial name
- Otus rutilus (Pucheran, 1849)

= Madagascar scops owl =

Madagascar Scops Owl

Species of owl

The Madagascar scops owl (Otus rutilus), also known as the Malagasy scops owl, is a species of owl in the family Strigidae. It is found throughout Madagascar, now that it has recently been lumped with the Torotoroka scops owl (O. r. madagascariensis), previously considered a separate species. The nominate O. r. rutilus is referred to as the rainforest scops owl.

== Description ==
The Madagascar scops owl is a relatively small owl with short, rounded wings and short erectile ear-tufts on top of the head. There are three morphs recorded of this species: a grey morph, a brown morph and a rufous morph. Features which stand out from the main plumage color are the pale eyebrows, light spots on the scapulars and the barring on the wings and outer tail feathers. Sometimes the crown and the underparts are streaked. The bill has a black tip and may be dull green through to yellowish-grey and the eyes are yellow. They measure 22–24 cm (8.7–9.4 in) in length and have a wingspan of 52–54 cm (20–21 in).

Two formerly distinct species were identified by different habitat preferences, with Torotoroka preferring drier habitats and rainforest preferring wetter forests. Some small plumage and vocal differences were noted but minimal genetic divergence was found. Therefore, Clements has merged the two species.

=== Voice ===
The typical song of the Madagascar scops owl is a series of between five and nine short, reverberating, clear hoots which can be rendered as "pu-pu-pu-pu-pu". These are repeated at intervals of several seconds.

== Distribution and habitat ==
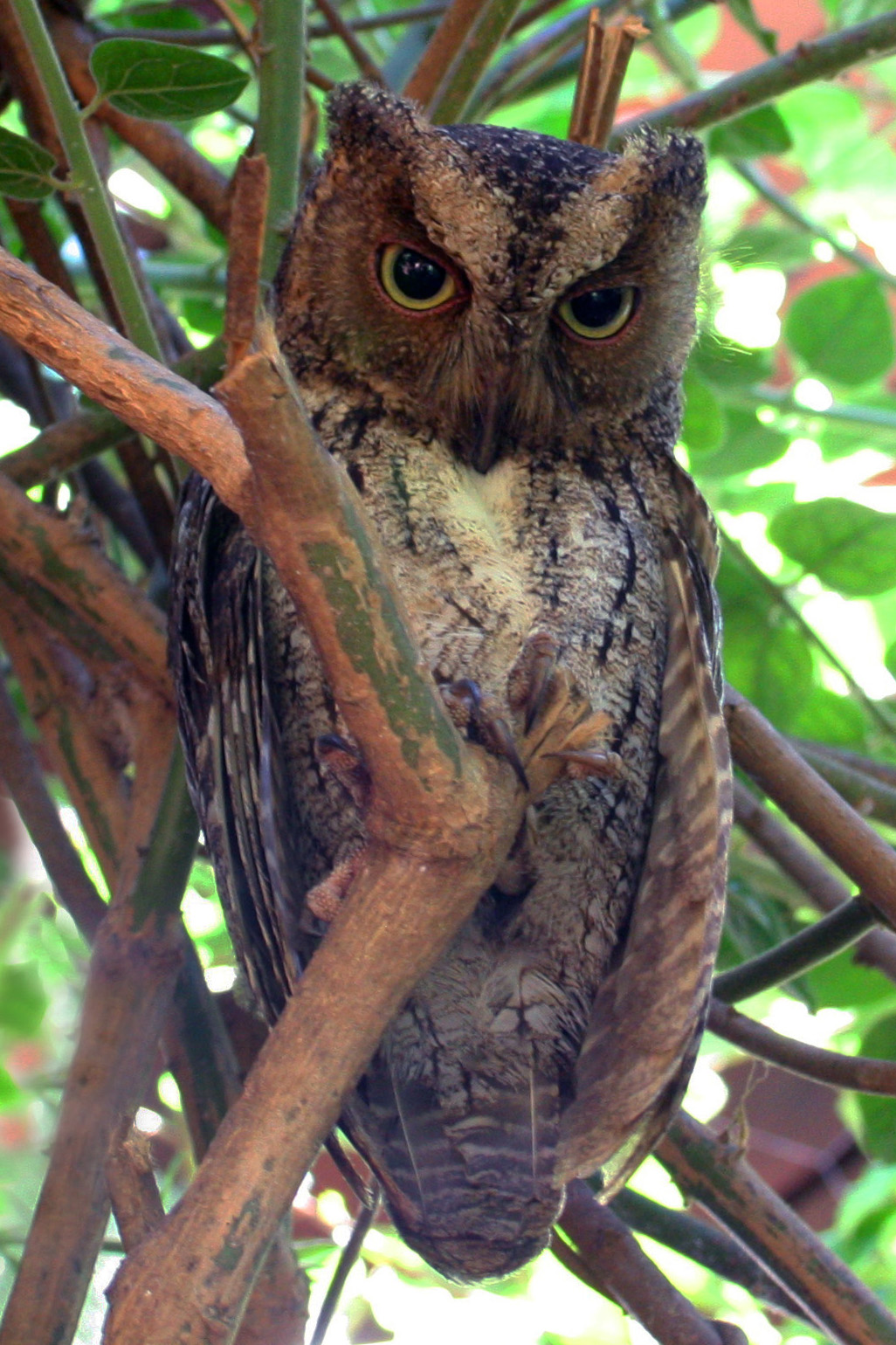
The Torotoroka scops owl

The Madagascar scops owl is endemic to Madagascar where it is found throughout the island. As its common name "rainforest" suggests, the nominate subspecies O. r. rutilus prefer humid tropical forest and bush and occurs in the east of the island, whereas the Torotoroka subspecies O. r. madagascariensis prefers drier habitats and occurs in the west of the island. Its natural habitat is subtropical or tropical dry forests, as well as man-made habitats such as parks, up to 2,000 m above sea level.

== Behaviour ==
The Madagascar scops owl feeds on invertebrates, such as grasshoppers, beetles, moths and spiders, as well as taking small vertebrates. It hunts mostly at night from a perch but will also catch moths on the wing. It roosts during the day, hidden in dense foliage, on a branch or next to the tree trunk. Little is known about the breeding biology of this species. The nest is in a tree hollow and 3 or 4 white eggs are laid, probably in November and December.

== Taxonomy ==
The rainforest scops owl, the Mayotte scops owl (O. mayottensis), the Pemba scops owl (O. pembaensis) and the Torotoroka scops owl (O. madagascarensis) have all previously been lumped as one species. Recent genetic studies have placed the Pemba scops owl closer to the clade containing the African scops owl (O. sengalensis), while the Mayotte scops owl is clearly separate from the remaining two. The status of the rainforest is debatable as there is very little genetic distance between the two taxa and subsequent studies have suggested that the plumage differences between O. rutilus and O. madagascariensis are small and that their voices intergrade. Therefore the rainforest and Torotoroka scops owls become subspecies under the new name Madagascar scops owl, taking the scientific name Otus rutilus.
