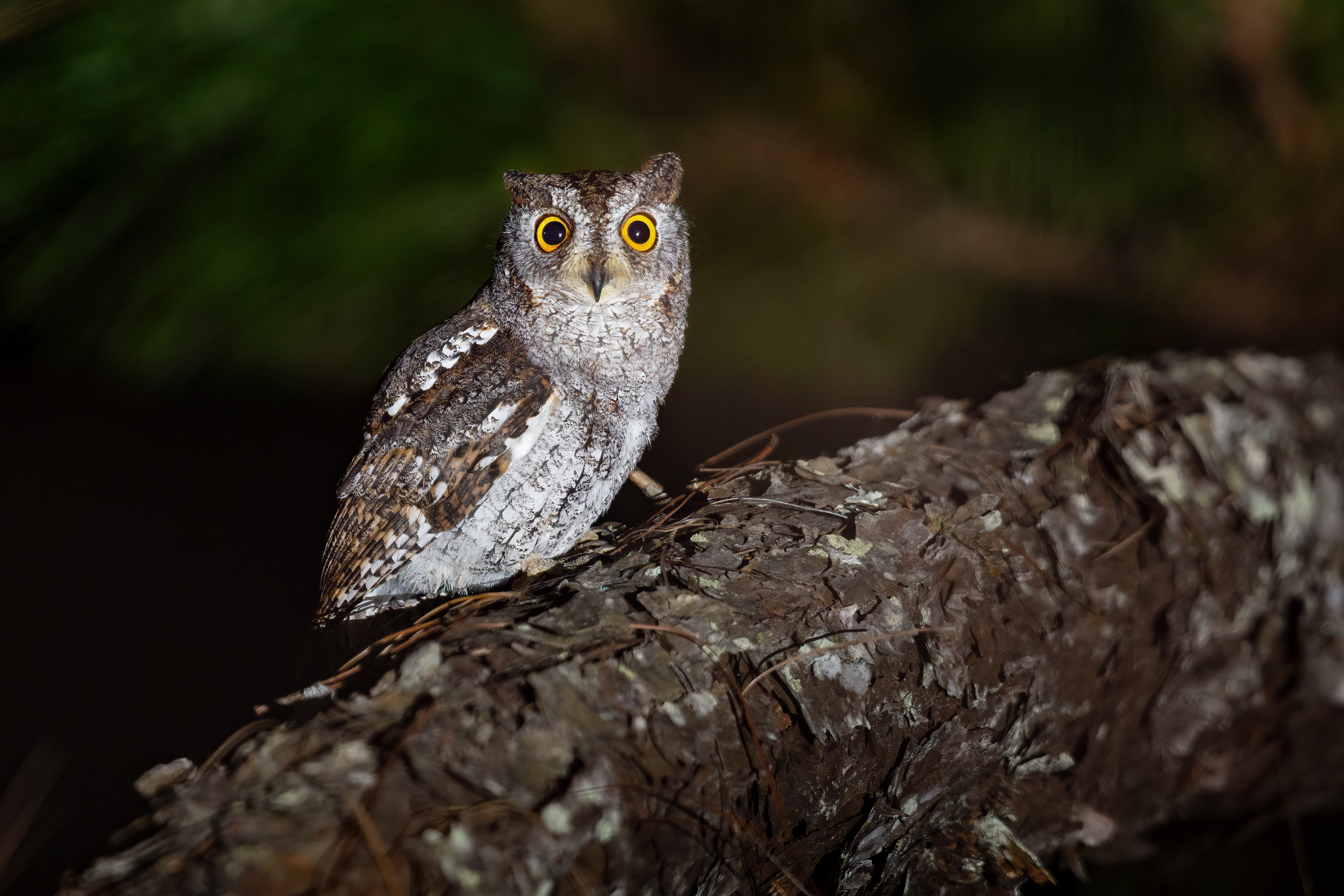

Conservation status
- Least Concern (IUCN 3.1)
- CITES Appendix II

Scientific classification
- Kingdom: Animalia
- Phylum: Chordata
- Class: Aves
- Order: Strigiformes
- Family: Strigidae
- Genus: Otus
- Species: O. sunia

Binomial name
- Otus sunia (Hodgson, 1836)

= Oriental scops owl =

Species of owl

The oriental scops owl (Otus sunia) is a scops owl species native to South and Southeast Asia.

Call
Call of oriental scops owl recorded in Parambikulam

== Description ==
The oriental scops owl is a small, variably plumaged, yellow-eyed owl with ear-tufts which are not always erect. It can be distinguished from the collared scops owl by its whitish scapular stripe, well-marked underparts, and lack of pale collar. There are two colour morphs, grey and rufous; intermediate forms also occur. Sexes are similar in appearance. Individuals may freeze with eyes half-closed when disturbed. The species has a repeated liquid call sounding like "tuk tok torok". Adults have higher-pitched calls than juveniles.

== Distribution and habitat ==
The oriental scops owl has an extremely wide distribution across eastern and southern Asia and inhabits dry deciduous forests from Russia to Thailand. The owl nests in holes in trees, especially Mahua trees, during February to April.
