= List of Strigiformes by population =

This is a list of Strigiformes species by global population. While numbers are estimates, they have been made by the experts in their fields. For more information on how these estimates were ascertained, see Wikipedia's articles on population biology and population ecology.

Not all Gruiformes have had their populations quantified, but species without population estimates are included in a secondary table below.

The IOC World Bird List (version 15.1) recognizes 254 species of Strigiformes, five of which are extinct. This list follows IUCN classifications for species names and taxonomy. Where IUCN classifications differ from other ornithological authorities, alternative names and taxonomies are noted.

Some members of Strigiformes are extinct:

- Bermuda saw-whet owl (Aegolius gradyi), described from fossil records and explorer accounts of the bird in the 17th century.
- Laughing owl (Ninox albifacies), last seen in 1914, may have been extant through 1920s.
- Mauritius scops owl or Mauritius owl (Otus sauzieri), last seen in 1837; extinct by 1859. IUCN/BirdLife International place species in genus Mascarenotus.
- Réunion scops owl or Réunion owl (Otus grucheti), went extinct in the 17th century after the colonization of the island of Réunion. IUCN/BirdLife International place species in genus Mascarenotus.
- Rodrigues scops owl or Rodrigues owl (Otus murivorus), last recorded in 1726. IUCN/BirdLife International place species in genus Mascarenotus.

== Species by global population ==
Common name	Binomial name	Population	Status	Trend	Notes	Image
Pernambuco pygmy owl	Glaucidium mooreorum	0-49	CR	▼	May be extinct. Last seen in 2001.	
Siau scops owl	Otus siaoensis	1-49	CR	Steady		
Seychelles scops owl	Otus insularis	200-280	CR	▼		
Christmas Island boobook (Christmas boobook)	Ninox natalis	240-1,200	VU	Steady	Best estimate for number of mature individuals is 340.	
Forest owlet	Athene blewitti	250-999	EN	▼		
Romblon boobook	Ninox spilonotus	250-999	EN	▼		
Cebu boobook	Ninox rumseyi	250-999	VU	Steady		
São Tomé scops owl	Otus hartlaubi	250-999	VU	▼	Total population is estimated to be 350-1,500 individuals.	
Long-whiskered owlet	Xenoglaux loweryi	250-999	VU	Steady	Total population is estimated to be 350-1,500 individuals.	
Camiguin boobook	Ninox leventisi	250-1,400	VU	Steady	Best estimate for number of mature individuals is 250-999.	
Moheli scops owl	Otus moheliensis	260	EN	▼		
Serendib scops owl	Otus thilohoffmanni	400-1,000	EN	▼		
Rote boobook	Ninox rotiensis	500-5,000	NT	▼		
Principe scops owl	Otus bikegila	853-2,533	CR	▼	Best estimate for number of mature individuals is 1,149-1,597.	
Blakiston's eagle-owl (Blakiston's fish owl)	Ketupa blakistoni	900-1,700	VU	▼	Best estimate for number of mature individuals is 900-1,150. IUCN/BirdLife International place this species in genus Bubo.	
Sokoke scops owl	Otus ireneae	1,000-2,000	EN	▼		
Madagascar red owl (Red owl)	Tyto soumagnei	1,250-3,750	VU	▼		
Shelley's eagle-owl	Bubo shelleyi	1,500-7,000	VU	▼	Total population is estimated to be 2,500-9,999 individuals.	
Cloud-forest pygmy owl	Glaucidium nubicola	1,900-22,500	VU	▼	Best estimate for number of mature individuals is 2,500-9,999.	
Socotra scops owl	Otus socotranus	2,000	LC	Steady	Total population is estimated to be 3,000 individuals.	
Togian boobook	Ninox burhani	2,100-8,100	NT	▼		
Powerful owl	Ninox strenua	2,200-2,800	LC	Steady	Total population is estimated to be 3,250-4,250 individuals.	
Grande Comore scops owl (Karthala scops owl)	Otus pauliani	2,300	EN	▼		
Anjouan scops owl	Otus capnodes	2,300-3,600	EN	▼		
Santa Marta screech owl	Megascops gilesi	2,300-7,500	VU	▼	Newly described species, as of 2017. Population has not been directly quantified, but is extrapolated using the population density of the congeneric tawny-bellied screech owl.	
Pemba scops owl	Otus pembaensis	2,500-3,000	VU	▼		
Sulu boobook	Ninox reyi	2,500-7,500	VU	▼		
Malaita owl	Athene malaitae	2,500-9,999	VU	▼		
Makira owl	Athene roseoaxillaris	2,500-9,999	VU	▼		
Flores scops owl	Otus alfredi	2,500-9,999	VU	▼		
Rufous fishing owl	Scotopelia ussheri	2,500-9,999	VU	▼		
Golden masked owl	Tyto aurantia	2,500-9,999	VU	▼		
Albertine owlet	Glaucidium albertinum	2,500-9,999	NT	▼	Total population is estimated to be 3,500-15,000 individuals.	
Fearful owl	Nesasio solomonensis	2,500-9,999	NT	▼		
Nicobar scops owl	Otus alius	2,500-9,999	NT	▼		
Javan scops owl	Otus angelinae	2,500-9,999	NT	▼		
Rinjani scops owl	Otus jolandae	2,500-9,999	NT	Steady		
Visayan scops owl (Negros scops owl)	Otus nigrorum	2,500-9,999	NT	▼		
Andaman boobook	Ninox affinis	2,500-9,999	LC	▼		
Enggano scops owl	Otus enganensis	2,500-9,999	LC	Steady		
Mindoro boobook	Ninox mindorensis	2,500-25,000	VU	▼	Best estimate for number of mature individuals in 2,500-9,999.	
Lesser sooty owl	Tyto multipunctata	4,000	LC	Steady	Estimated to be around 2,000 breeding pairs.	
Arabian eagle-owl	Bubo milesi	4,000-9,999	LC	Steady		
Sumba boobook	Ninox rudolfi	5,000-24,000	NT	▼	Best estimate for number of mature individuals is 5,000-15,000.	
Least boobook	Ninox sumbaensis	10,000-19,999	EN	▼	Total population is estimated to be 15,000-30,000 individuals.	
New Britain boobook	Ninox odiosa	10,000-19,999	VU	▼		
Guadalcanal owl	Athene granti	10,000-19,999	NT	▼		
Palawan scops owl	Otus fuliginosus	10,000-19,999	LC	▼		
Mentawai scops owl	Otus mentawi	10,000-19,999	LC	Steady		
Chestnut-backed owlet	Glaucidium castanonotum	10,000-20,000	NT	▼		
Cyprus scops owl	Otus cyprius	10,000-24,000	LC	?	Total population is estimated to be 15,000-36,000 individuals.	
Banggai scops owl	Otus mendeni	10,000-40,000	NT	▼		
Flammulated owl	Psiloscops flammeolus	12,000	LC	?		
Tanimbar boobook	Ninox forbesi	12,000-48,000	LC	Steady		
Snowy owl	Bubo scandiacus	14,000-28,000	VU	▼		
Spotted owl	Strix occidentalis	15,000	NT	▼		
Biak scops owl	Otus beccarii	15,000-45,000	NT	▼	Best estimate for number of mature individuals is 15,000-20,000.	
Mindoro scops owl	Otus mindorensis	15,750-44,000	NT	▼		
Tamaulipas pygmy owl	Glaucidium sanchezi	20,000-49,999	NT	▼		
Colima pygmy owl	Glaucidium palmarum	20,000-49,999	LC	▼		
Bearded screech owl	Megascops barbarus	20,000-49,999	LC	▼		
Bare-shanked screech owl	Megascops clarkii	20,000-49,999	LC	Steady		
Balsas screech owl	Megascops seductus	20,000-49,999	LC	▼		
Unspotted saw-whet owl	Aegolius ridgwayi	20,000-50,000	LC	▼		
Costa Rican pygmy owl	Glaucidium costaricanum	20,000-50,000	LC	Steady		
Fulvous owl	Strix fulvescens	20,000-50,000	LC	▼		
Great grey owl	Strix nebulosa	50,000-99,999	LC	▲		
Stygian owl	Asio stygius	50,000-499,999	LC	▼		
Pacific screech owl	Megascops cooperi	50,000-499,999	LC	▼		
Central American pygmy owl	Glaucidium griseiceps	50,000-500,000	LC	▼		
Guatemalan screech owl (Middle American screech owl)	Megascops guatemalae	50,000-500,000	LC	▼	Note that IOC taxonomy splits two additional species from this one: Chocó screech owl (M. centralis) and foothill screech owl (M. roraimae). IUCN/BirdLife International maintain all three species within M. guatemalae.	
Arabian scops owl	Otus pamelae	60,000	LC	Steady		
Elf owl	Micrathene whitneyi	72,000	LC	▼		
Western screech owl	Megascops kennicottii	73,000-230,000	LC	▼		
Northern hawk-owl	Surnia ulula	100,000-499,999	LC	Steady		
Northern pygmy-owl (Mountain pygmy-owl)	Glaucidium gnoma	180,000	LC	▲	Note that IOC taxonomy splits three additional species from this one: the northern (G. californicum), Guatemalan (G. cobanense), and Baja (G. hoskinsii) pygmy-owls. IUCN/BirdLife International maintain all four species within G. gnoma.	
Eurasian eagle-owl	Bubo bubo	180,000-300,000	LC	▼		
Whiskered screech owl	Megascops trichopsis	200,000	LC	▼		
Eurasian pygmy owl	Glaucidium passerinum	471,000-894,000	LC	Steady		
Striped owl	Asio clamator	500,000-4,999,999	LC	▼		
Tropical screech owl	Megascops choliba	500,000-4,999,999	LC	▼		
Mottled owl	Strix virgata	500,000-4,999,999	LC	▼	IUCN/BirdLife International place this species in genus Ciccaba.	
Eastern screech owl	Megascops asio	560,000	LC	▼		
Ural owl	Strix uralensis	640,000-1,052,000	LC	Steady		
Boreal owl	Aegolius funereus	730,000-1,810,000	LC	Steady		
Eurasian scops owl	Otus scops	790,000-1,350,000	LC	▼		
Burrowing owl	Athene cunicularia	1,000,000-9,999,999	LC	Steady		
Short-eared owl	Asio flammeus	1,200,000-2,100,000	LC	▼		
Tawny owl	Strix aluco	1,580,000-2,340,000	LC	Steady	Note that IOC taxonomy splits an additional species, the Maghreb owl (S. mauritanica) from this one. IUCN/BirdLife International maintain both species within S. aluco.	
Common barn owl (Western barn owl)	Tyto alba	1,960,000-3,240,000	LC	?	Note that IOC taxonomy splits three additional species from this one: American barn owl (T. furcata), Eastern barn owl (T. javanica), and Andaman masked owl (T. deroepstorffi). IUCN/BirdLife International maintain all four species within T. alba.	
Northern saw-whet owl	Aegolius acadicus	2,000,000	LC	▲		
Long-eared owl	Asio otus	2,200,000-3,700,000	LC	▼		
Barred owl	Strix varia	3,000,000-3,900,000	LC	▲	Note that IOC taxonomy splits an additional species, the cinereous owl (S. sartorii) from this one. IUCN/BirdLife International maintain both species within S. varia.	
Little owl	Athene noctua	5,000,000-9,999,999	LC	Steady		
Great horned owl	Bubo virginianus	5,700,000	LC	Steady	IUCN/BirdLife International do not report a population estimate. Value given comes from Partners in Flight database.	
Ferruginous pygmy owl	Glaucidium brasilianum	20,000,000	LC	▼		

== Species without population estimates ==
Common name	Binomial name	Population	Status	Trend	Notes	Image
Itombwe owl	Tyto prigoginei	?	DD	?	Known from two records, in 1951 and 1996.	
Philippine eagle-owl	Ketupa philippensis	?	VU	▼	IUCN/BirdLife International place species in genus Bubo.	
White-fronted scops owl	Otus sagittatus	?	VU	▼		
Barred eagle-owl	Ketupa sumatrana	?	NT	▼	IUCN/BirdLife International place species in genus Bubo.	
Ochre-bellied boobook	Ninox ochracea	?	NT	▼		
Chocolate boobook	Ninox randi	?	NT	▼		
Mindanao boobook	Ninox spilocephala	?	NT	▼		
Ryūkyū scops owl	Otus elegans	?	NT	▼		
Giant scops owl	Otus gurneyi	?	NT	▼		
Reddish scops owl	Otus rufescens	?	NT	▼		
Sula scops owl	Otus sulaensis	?	NT	▼		
Chaco owl	Strix chacoensis	?	NT	▼		
Taliabu masked owl	Tyto nigrobrunnea	?	NT	▼		
Buff-fronted owl	Aegolius harrisii	?	LC	▼		
Abyssinian owl	Asio abyssinicus	?	LC	Steady		
Marsh owl	Asio capensis	?	LC	Steady		
Madagascar owl	Asio madagascariensis	?	LC	▼		
Spotted owlet	Athene brama	?	LC	Steady		
West Solomons owl	Athene jacquinoti	?	LC	▼		
White-browed owl	Athene superciliaris	?	LC	▼		
Spotted eagle-owl	Bubo africanus	?	LC	Steady		
Pharaoh eagle-owl	Bubo ascalaphus	?	LC	Steady		
Rock eagle-owl (Indian eagle-owl)	Bubo bengalensis	?	LC	▼		
Cape eagle-owl	Bubo capensis	?	LC	Steady		
Greyish eagle-owl	Bubo cinerascens	?	LC	Steady		
Lesser horned owl	Bubo magellanicus	?	LC	▼		
Yungas pygmy owl	Glaucidium bolivianum	?	LC	▼		
Collared owlet	Glaucidium brodiei	?	LC	▼		
African barred owlet	Glaucidium capense	?	LC	▼		
Javan owlet	Glacidium castanopterum	?	LC	▼		
Asian barred owlet	Glaucidium cucoloides	?	LC	▲		
Amazonian pygmy-owl	Glaucidium hardyi	?	LC	▼		
Andean pygmy owl	Glaucidium jardinii	?	LC	▼		
Least pygmy owl (East Brazilian pygmy owl)	Glaucidium minutissimum	?	LC	▼		
Austral pygmy owl	Glaucidium nana	?	LC	Steady		
Subtropical pygmy owl	Glaucidium parkeri	?	LC	▼		
Pearl-spotted owlet	Glaucidium perlatum	?	LC	▼		
Peruvian pygmy owl (Pacific pygmy owl)	Glaucidium peruanum	?	LC	▼		
Jungle owlet	Glaucidium radiatum	?	LC	▼		
Cuban pygmy owl	Glaudicium siju	?	LC	▼		
Sjöstedt's owlet (Sjöstedt's barred owlet)	Glaucidium sjostedti	?	LC	▼		
Red-chested owlet	Glaucidium tephronotum	?	LC	▼		
Puerto Rican owl	Gymnasio nudipes	?	LC	▼		
Maned owl	Jubula lettii	?	LC	▼		
Dusky eagle-owl	Ketupa coromanda	?	LC	▼	IUCN/BirdLife International place species in genus Bubo.	
Tawny fish owl	Ketupa flavipes	?	LC	▼		
Buffy fish owl	Ketupa ketupu	?	LC	Steady		
Verreaux's eagle-owl	Ketupa lactea	?	LC	▼	IUCN/BirdLife International place species in genus Bubo.	
Akun eagle-owl	Ketupa leucosticta	?	LC	▼	IUCN/BirdLife International place species in genus Bubo.	
Spot-bellied eagle-owl	Ketupa nipalensis	?	LC	▼	IUCN/BirdLife International place species in genus Bubo.	
Fraser's eagle-owl	Ketupa poensis	?	LC	▼	IUCN/BirdLife International place species in genus Bubo.	
Brown fish owl	Ketupa zeylonensis	?	LC	▼		
Crested owl	Lophostrix cristata	?	LC	▼		
Bare-legged owl	Margarobyas lawrencii	?	LC	▼		
White-throated screech owl	Megascops albogularis	?	LC	▼		
Black-capped screech owl	Megascops atricapilla	?	LC	▼		
Yungas screech owl	Megascops hoyi	?	LC	▼		
Rufescent screech owl	Megascops ingens	?	LC	Steady	Some taxonomists split an additional species, the Colombian screech-owl (M. colombianus) from this species. However, neither IOC or IUCN/BirdLife International treat it as a subspecies of M. ingens.	
Koepcke's screech owl	Megascops koepckeae	?	LC	▼		
Cloud-forest screech owl	Megascops marshalli	?	LC	Steady		
Cinnamon screech owl	Megascops petersoni	?	LC	▼		
Peruvian screech owl (West Peruvian screech owl)	Megascops roboratus	?	LC	▼		
Long-tufted screech owl	Megascops sanctaecatarinae	?	LC	▼		
Tawny-bellied screech owl	Megascops watsonii	?	LC	▼		
Southern boobook (Australian boobook)	Ninox boobook	?	LC	▼		
Barking owl	Ninox connivens	?	LC	Steady		
Timor boobook	Ninox fusca	?	LC	▼		
Buru boobook	Ninox hantu	?	LC	Steady		
Halmahera boobook	Ninox hypogramma	?	LC	▼		
Cinnabar boobook	Ninox ios	?	LC	Steady		
Northern boobook	Ninox japonica	?	LC	Steady		
Tasmanian boobok	Ninox leucopsis	?	LC	Steady		
Manus boobook	Ninox meeki	?	LC	Steady		
Morepork	Ninox novaeseelandiae	?	LC	Steady		
Hume's boobook	Ninox obscura	?	LC	Steady		
Luzon boobook	Ninox philippensis	?	LC	▼		
Alor boobook	Ninox plesseni	?	LC	Steady		
Speckled boobook	Ninox punctulata	?	LC	▼		
Rufous owl	Ninox rufa	?	LC	▼		
Brown boobook	Ninox scutulata	?	LC	▼		
Seram boobook	Ninox squamipila	?	LC	▼		
Jungle boobook (Papuan boobook)	Ninox theomacha	?	LC	▼		
Bismarck boobook (New Ireland boobook)	Ninox variegata	?	LC	▼		
Indian scops owl	Otus bakkamoena	?	LC	Steady		
Andaman scops owl	Otus balli	?	LC	Steady		
Rajah scops owl	Otus brookii	?	LC	▼		
Pallid scops owl	Otus brucei	?	LC	Steady		
Sangihe scops owl	Otus collari	?	LC	Steady		
Mindanao Lowlands scops owl (Everett's scops owl)	Otus everetti	?	LC	▼		
Sandy scops owl	Otus icterorhynchus	?	LC	▼		
Sunda scops owl	Otus lempiji	?	LC	▼		
Collared scops owl	Otus lettia	?	LC	▼		
Luzon highland scops owl (Luzon scops owl)	Otus longicornis	?	LC	▼		
Moluccan scops owl	Otus magicus	?	LC	▼		
Sulawesi scops owl	Otus manadensis	?	LC	▼		
Mantanani scops owl	Otus mantananensis	?	LC	Steady		
Mayotte scops owl	Otus mayottensis	?	LC	Steady		
Luzon Lowland scops owl (Philippine scops owl)	Otus megalotis	?	LC	▼		
Mindanao Highlands scops owl (Mindanao scops owl)	Otus mirus	?	LC	▼		
Palau owl (Palau scops owl)	Otus podargina	?	LC	Steady	IUCN/BirdLife International place this species in genus Pyrroglaux.	
Madagascar scops owl (Rainforest scops owl)	Otus rutilus	?	LC	▼	Note that IOC taxonomy splits an additional species, the Torotoroka scops owl (O. madagascariensis), from this species. IUCN/BirdLife International maintain both species within O. rutilis.	
Japanese scops owl	Otus semitorques	?	LC	▼		
African scops owl	Otus senegalensis	?	LC	Steady	Note that IOC taxonomy splits an additional species, the Annobón scops owl (O. feae), from this species. IUCN/BirdLife International maintain both species within O. senegalensis.	
Wallace's scops owl	Otus silvicola	?	LC	▼		
Mountain scops owl	Otus spilocephalus	?	LC	Steady		
Oriental scops owl	Otus sunia	?	LC	Steady		
Wetar scops owl	Otus tempestatis	?	LC	Steady		
Simeulue scops owl	Otus umbra	?	LC	Steady		
Sri Lanka bay owl	Phodilus assimilis	?	LC	▼		
Oriental bay owl	Phodilus badius	?	LC	Steady		
Jamaican owl	Pseudoscops grammicus	?	LC	Steady		
Southern white-faced owl	Ptilopsis granti	?	LC	▼		
Northern white-faced owl	Ptilopsis leucotis	?	LC	▼		
Tawny-browed owl	Pulsatrix koeniswaldiana	?	LC	▼		
Band-bellied owl	Pulsatrix melanota	?	LC	▼		
Spectacled owl	Pulsatrix perspicillata	?	LC	▼		
Vermiculated fishing owl	Scotopelia bouvieri	?	LC	▼		
Pel's fishing owl	Scotopelia peli	?	LC	▼		
Rufous-banded owl	Strix albitarsis	?	LC	▼	IUCN/BirdLife International place species in genus Ciccaba.	
Omani owl	Strix butleri	?	LC	Steady		
Desert tawny owl (Desert owl)	Strix hadorami	?	LC	Steady		
Black-banded owl	Strix huhula	?	LC	▼	IUCN/BirdLife International place species in genus Ciccaba.	
Rusty-barred owl	Strix hylophila	?	LC	▼		
Brown wood owl	Strix leptogrammica	?	LC	▼		
Mottled wood owl	Strix ocellata	?	LC	▼		
Black-and-white owl	Strix nigrolineata	?	LC	▼	IUCN/BirdLife International place species in genus Ciccaba.	
Himalayan owl	Strix nivicolum	?	LC	▼		
Rufous-legged owl	Strix rufipes	?	LC	▼		
Spotted wood owl	Strix seloputo	?	LC	▼		
African wood owl	Strix woodfordii	?	LC	▼		
Sunda owlet	Taenioptynx sylvaticus	?	LC	▼	IUCN/BirdLife International places this species in genus Glaucidium.	
African grass owl	Tyto capensis	?	LC	Steady		
Ashy-faced owl	Tyto glaucops	?	LC	▼		
Minahasa masked owl	Tyto inexspectata	?	LC	▼		
Eastern grass owl	Tyto longimembris	?	LC	▼		
Australasian masked owl (Australian masked owl)	Tyto novaehollandiae	?	LC	▼	Note that IOC taxonomy splits two additional species, the Manus masked owl (T. manusi) and Moluccan masked owl (T. sororcula), from this species. IUCN/BirdLife International maintain all three species within T. novaehollandiae.	
Sulawesi masked owl	Tyto rosenbergii	?	LC	Steady		
Greater sooty owl	Tyto tenebricosa	?	LC	▼		
Papuan hawk-owl	Uroglaux dimorpha	?	LC	▼		

== See also ==
- Lists of birds by population
- Lists of organisms by population
