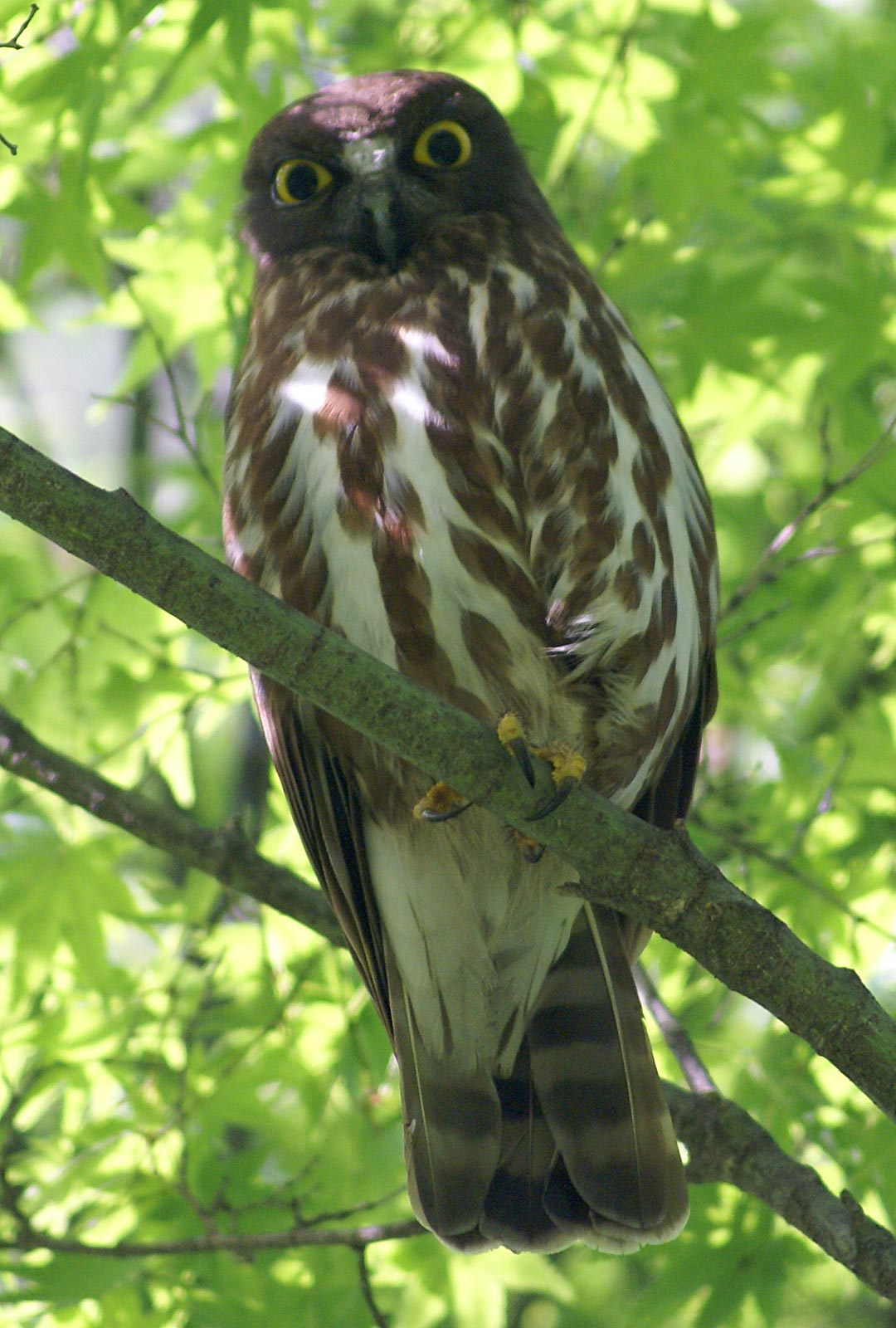

Conservation status
- Least Concern (IUCN 3.1)
- CITES Appendix II

Scientific classification
- Kingdom: Animalia
- Phylum: Chordata
- Class: Aves
- Order: Strigiformes
- Family: Strigidae
- Genus: Ninox
- Species: N. japonica

Binomial name
- Ninox japonica (Temminck & Schlegel, 1845)

Subspecies
- Ninox japonica japonica; Ninox japonica totogo

Synonyms
- Ninox scutulata japonica

= Northern boobook =

Species of owl

The northern boobook (Ninox japonica) belongs to the family Strigidae (true owls) and is a raptorial owl endemic to eastern and southern countries of Asia. The species was considered, until recently, a conspecific of Ninox scutulata or brown boobook, a species of similar distribution encompassing 11 subspecies. The species currently includes two subspecies, the migrant Ninox japonica japonica and the non-migrant Ninox japonica totogo. Despite being considered as the most common breeding owl in Japan, little research has been conducted on the species and subspecies and the taxonomic classification of N. j. totogo and N. j. japonica has been a subject of debate. There are no indications of significant decline in northern boobook populations and therefore its conservation status has been classified as least concern by the IUCN Red List.

== Description ==
Ninox japonica is a hawk owl species with a body length averaging between 29 and 33 cm and a wingspan of approximately 60 to 70 cm wide. Current knowledge on the species shows no sexual dimorphism and an average weight of approximately 168g. The northern boobook has a hawk-like appearance and its subspecies are practically indistinguishable. Individuals of the species will have a brown back and wings with lighter brown horizontal streaks on the tail feathers. The neck, crown and face of this bird are slightly more greyish brown aside from a small white patch above the beak. It has striking yellow gold eyes, a black beak and yellow talons. Its belly is almost completely white aside from rust-colored specks, which bear similarity to its sister species the brown boobook (N. scutulata). Aside from mitochondrial distinction, research has determined that subspecies of Ninox japonica, N. j. totogo and N. j. japonica, can be differentiated through the shorter wing chord (214-217mm) and the longer tail (118mm) of N. j. totogo. This has been hypothesized to be an adaptation due to the migratory nature of N. j. totogo.

== Taxonomy ==
The Ninox genus, also called brown hawk owls, contains 36 species, with territories spread out over Australia and most of Asia. Select species within the genus are recognized for their reversed sexual dimorphism and a unique behavior called "prey holding" or "mantling".

The Ninox japonica species was originally considered a conspecific with N. scutulata, as one of the three species that make up the brown boobook complex along with the chocolate boobook, N. randi, and the brown boobook, N. scutulata. This group of owls with habitats spanning over East Asia, South-East Siberia, North Korea, Taiwan, Japan and the Philippines was recognized to have 11 phenotypically varying subspecies, before being divided into three distinct species in the early 2000s. N. japonica was classified as a species different from N. scutulata based on specific vocal characters. Furthermore, the northern boobook species was also divided into the migratory subspecies N. j. japonica, and the sedentary N. j. totogo, resident of Taiwan. These two populations have been classified on the basis of being mitochondrially distinct, with slightly different breeding periods and a few specific morphological differences, such as wing chord length and tail length. Whether these two populations should be considered distinct species has been debated in the scientific community, where some consider N. j. totogo as more of a cryptic lineage and suggest treating it as an invalid taxon until further research is conducted.

== Habitat and distribution ==
Its habitat mainly consists of low altitude deciduous forests with thick vegetation and it will typically create its nest within trees, where they are practically indiscernible. These boobooks are also rarely seen reusing their nesting sites. These birds have also been identified in wooded parks, gardens and residential areas. They will typically winter in rainforests south of their summer home range and can occasionally be found in mixed or coniferous forests.

Siberia and most of Southeastern Asia make up the geographical distribution of Ninox japonica. The migrant N. j. japonica occupies the majority of this range, whereas N. j. totogo inhabits the Ryukyu Islands and Taiwan year-round. Specifically, Vietnam, Malaysia, Thailand and the Philippines are common wintering territories for N. j. japonica, while southern and central China, Korea, Japan and Siberia encompass its breeding and summering ranges. Both subspecies of N. japonica have been recorded occasionally coexisting in Taiwan.

== Behavior ==
=== Diet and foraging ===
The northern boobook preys mainly on invertebrates and occasionally on vertebrates. Invertebrate prey identified were mostly insects and vertebrate prey were mainly smaller birds, with the rare exception of lizards and bats. The northern boobook has been described as a generalist in its foraging preferences. It is a nocturnal hunter that will spot its prey from a perch and swoop down to capture it in midair or from the ground.

=== Reproduction ===
Male northern boobooks of the subspecies N. j. totogo begin to occupy their breeding territories as early as January and they bond with a female by February. During this time, boobook couples have been observed moving around together and vocalizing more frequently. This behavior will typically denote the period in which the birds copulate, persisting until the eggs have been hatched. Incubation will typically last around 28 days from early March to early April. Female northern boobooks will undertake incubation alone and will typically lay 3 or 4 eggs. The juvenile birds remain in the nest for approximately 26 days before fledging, which occurs in May. The migratory northern boobooks, N. j. japonica, do not typically occupy breeding sites before April, and their breeding season only lasts 4 months compared to that of N. j. totogo, which lasts for an estimated 5 months.

=== Vocalization ===
Northern boobooks vocalize through a sequence of deep ho-hos and this behavior is specific to breeding individuals during their reproductive periods. Correspondingly, the vocalization of N. japonica is seldom heard in regions where it is migrant or a winter resident.

== Conservation ==
There are no global trends of Ninox japonica population declines and its conservation status is of least concern according to the IUCN Red list. This being said, very little information is available on their population size across their geographic range.
