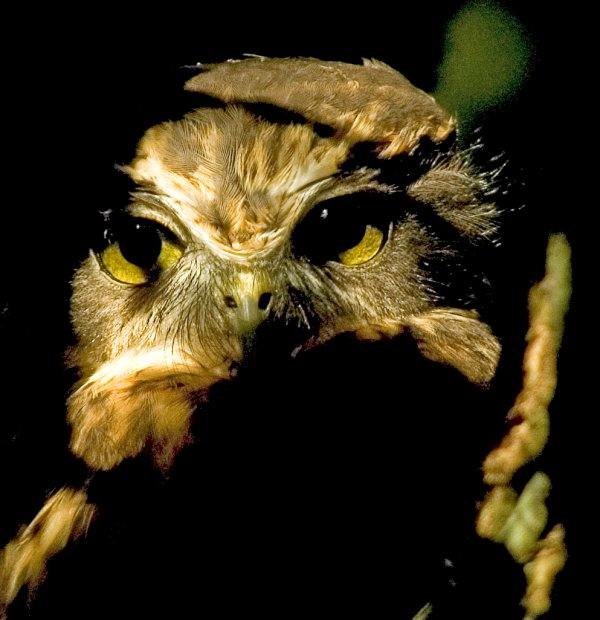
- Morepork (Ninox novaeseelandiae)

Scientific classification
- Kingdom: Animalia
- Phylum: Chordata
- Class: Aves
- Order: Strigiformes
- Family: Strigidae
- Genus: Ninox; Hodgson, 1837

Type species
- Ninox nipalensis = Strix lugubris Tickell 1833

= Ninox =

Genus of birds

Ninox is a genus of true owls comprising 36 extant and one extinct species found in Asia and Australasia. Many species are known as hawk-owls or boobooks, but the northern hawk-owl (Surnia ulula) is not a member of this genus.

== Taxonomy ==
The genus was introduced by English naturalist Brian Houghton Hodgson in 1837 with the type species as Ninox nipalensis, a junior synonym of Strix lugubris Tickell 1833. Strix lugubris is now considered a subspecies of the brown boobook (Ninox scutulata lugubris).

== Etymology ==
The ornithologist who first described Ninox ios gives the origin of the genus name as a portmanteau of nisus and noctua.

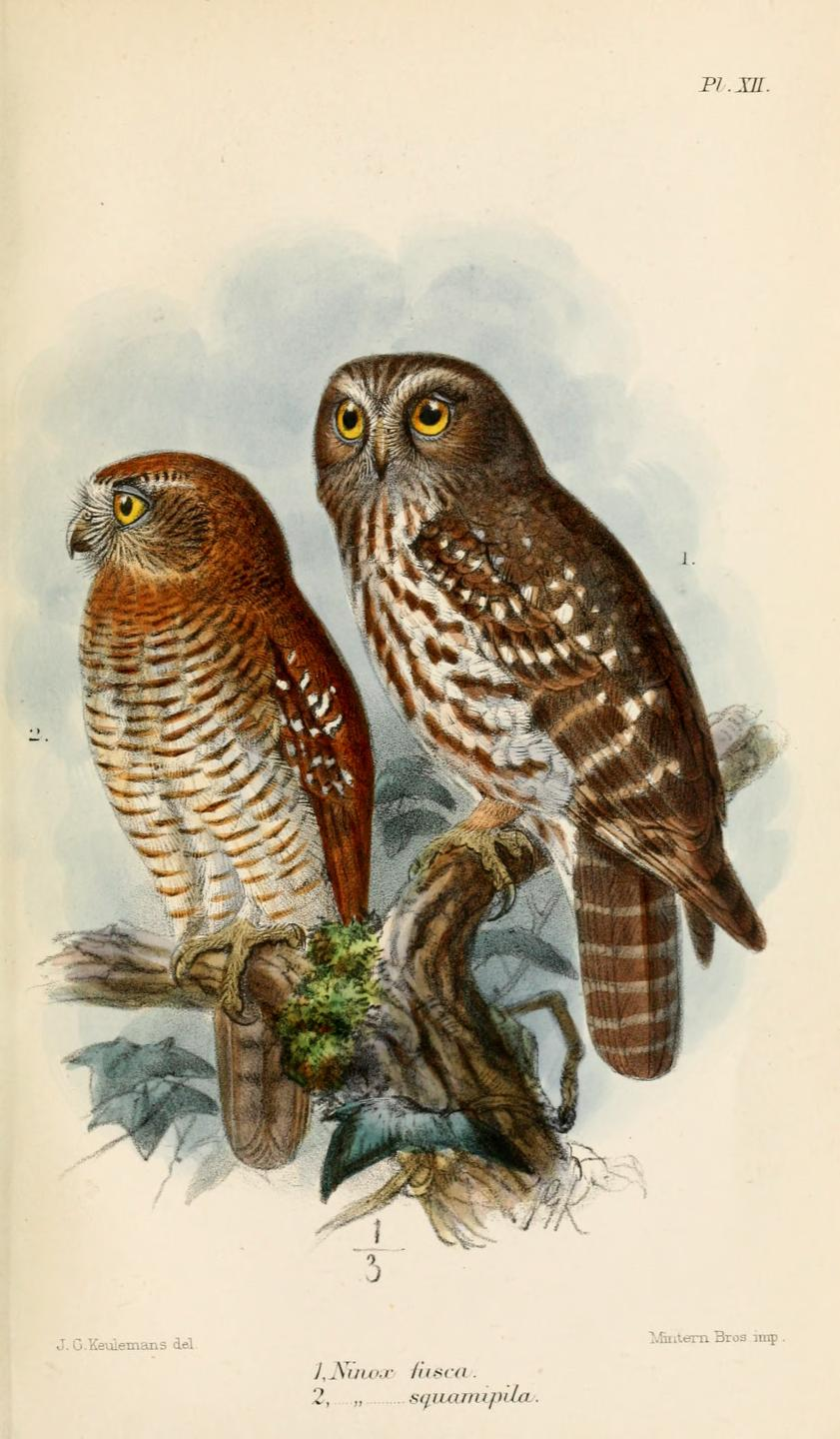
Seram boobook (N. squamipila) (left); Timor boobook (N. fusca) (right)

== Species ==
The genus contains 37 species:

- † Laughing owl, Ninox albifacies (extinct)
- Rufous owl, Ninox rufa
- Powerful owl, Ninox strenua
- Barking owl, Ninox connivens
- Great Sumba boobook, Ninox rudolfi
- Australian boobook, Ninox boobook
- Rote boobook Ninox rotiensis
- Timor boobook Ninox fusca
- Alor boobook, Ninox plesseni
- Tasmanian boobook, Ninox leucopsis
- Morepork, Ninox novaeseelandiae
- Northern boobook, Ninox japonica
- Brown boobook, Ninox scutulata
- Hume's boobook, Ninox obscura
- Chocolate boobook, Ninox randi
- Andaman boobook, Ninox affinis
- Philippine hawk-owl group
  - Luzon boobook, Ninox philippensis
  - Mindanao boobook, Ninox spilocephala
  - Camiguin boobook, Ninox leventisi
  - Sulu boobook, Ninox reyi
  - Cebu boobook, Ninox rumseyi
  - Romblon boobook, Ninox spilonotus
  - Mindoro boobook, Ninox mindorensis
- Little Sumba boobook, Ninox sumbaensis
- Togian boobook, Ninox burhani
- Ochre-bellied boobook, Ninox ochracea
- Cinnabar boobook, Ninox ios
- Moluccan boobook group
  - Halmahera boobook, Ninox hypogramma
  - Buru boobook, Ninox hantu
  - Seram boobook, Ninox squamipila
  - Tanimbar boobook, Ninox forbesi
- Christmas boobook, Ninox natalis
- Manus boobook, Ninox meeki
- Papuan boobook, Ninox theomacha
- Speckled boobook, Ninox punctulata
- New Britain boobook, Ninox odiosa
- New Ireland boobook, Ninox variegata

Genomic studies of the extinct laughing owl of New Zealand indicate that it actually belongs in Ninox rather than the monotypic genus Sceloglaux. The fossil owls "Otus" wintershofensis and "Strix" brevis, both from the Early or Middle Miocene of Wintershof, Germany, are close to this genus; the latter was sometimes explicitly placed in Ninox (Olson 1985), but is now in Intutula. "Strix" edwardsi from the Late Miocene of La Grive St. Alban, France, might also belong into this group.

== In human culture ==
- "NINOX" is an Australian Army project to develop night-vision goggles; it is named after Ninox strenua.
