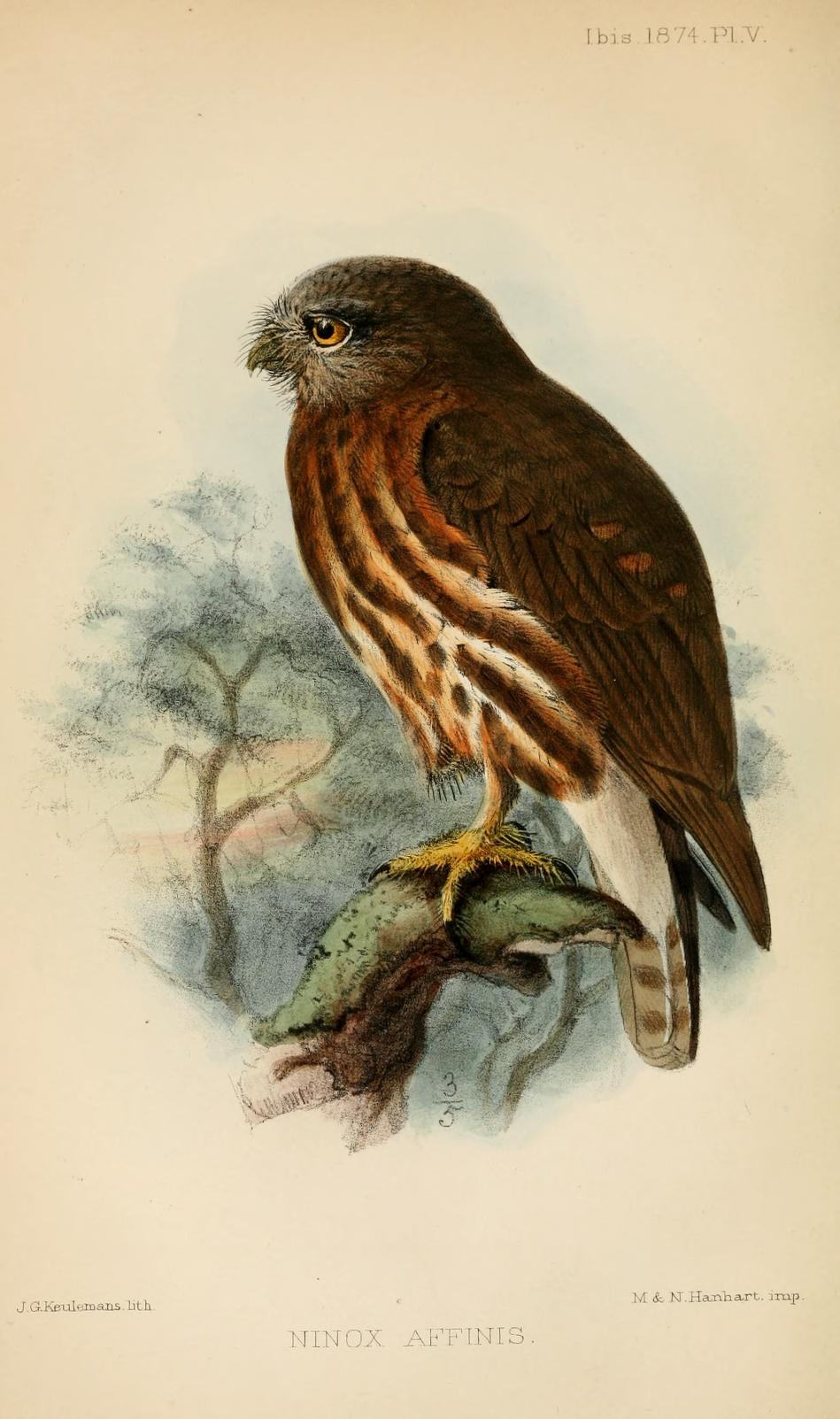

Conservation status
- Least Concern (IUCN 3.1)
- CITES Appendix II

Scientific classification
- Kingdom: Animalia
- Phylum: Chordata
- Class: Aves
- Order: Strigiformes
- Family: Strigidae
- Genus: Ninox
- Species: N. affinis

Binomial name
- Ninox affinis Beavan, 1867

= Andaman boobook =

Species of owl

The Andaman boobook (Ninox affinis), or Andaman hawk owl, is a species of bird belonging to the family Strigidae, the typical owls. This owl is endmeic to the Andaman Islands in India.

== Taxonomy ==
The Andaman boobook was first formally described in 1867 by the British Bengal Army officer and zoologist Robert Cecil Beavan with its type locality given as Aberdeen Point, Port Blair on the Andaman Islands. This species is included in the genus Ninox which is the only genus in the tribe Ninoxini in the subfamily Ninoxinae of the typical owl family Strigidae in the order Strigiformes.

== Etymology ==
The Andaman boobook is classified in the genus Ninox, this name is derived from the genus names Nisus and Noctua, the first was used for the Eurasian sparrowhawk (Accipter nisus) while the second was used for the little owl (Athene noctua). Hodgson, the proposer of the genus, described Strix lugubris, the type species of the genus as being the "most acciptrine of the owls". The specific name, affinis, means "related to" or "allied to", and refers to the similarity of the Andaman boobook to the brown boobook (N. scutulata).

== Description ==
The Andaman boobook is very similar to the brown hawk owl and to Hume's boobook (N. obscura) but this species is smaller and briowner with clear bright reddish streaks on the underparts and yellow eyes. The facial disc is greyish, the rest of the crown and mantle are a uniform brown. There are some buffy patches on the scapulars and the flight and tail feathers are barred with brown and buff. The underparts are pale buff, typically streaked with rufous, the underwing coverts and axillaries are more orange but the coverrs are barred. Theere are feathers on the tarsi down to the base of the toes. This species has a total length of 25 to 30 cm (9.8 to 11.8 in) and a weight of 236 g (8.3 oz). The call of this owl is a clear loud and low growling “kroooo.”

== Distribution and habitat ==
The Andaman boobookis endemic to the Andaman Islands which are part of the Indian Union territory of the Andaman and Nicobar Islands. It is found in lowland moist forest and secondary forest, occasionally it has been recorded in mangrove and has been reported from settlement, plantations, clearings and open woodland.

== Gallery ==
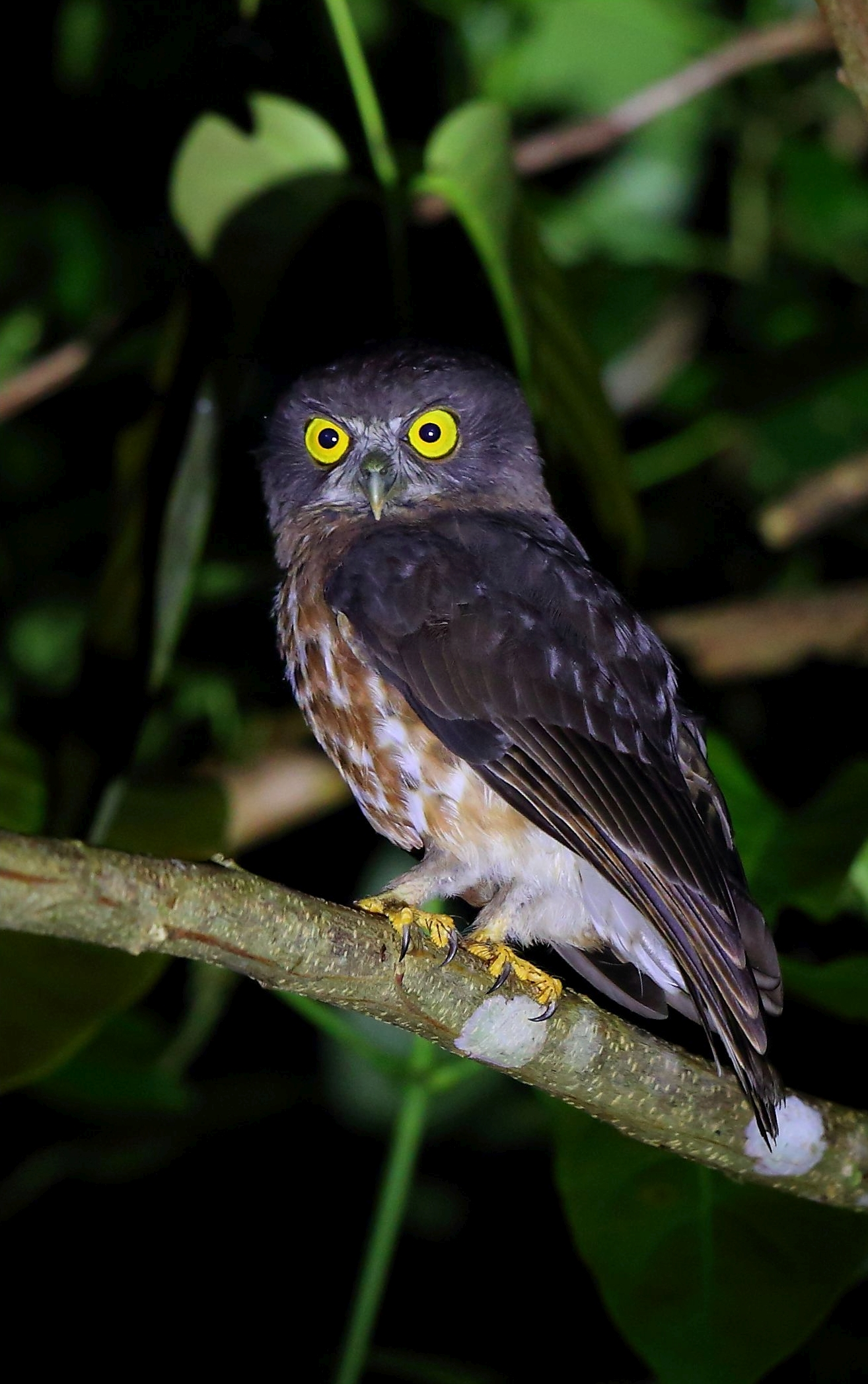

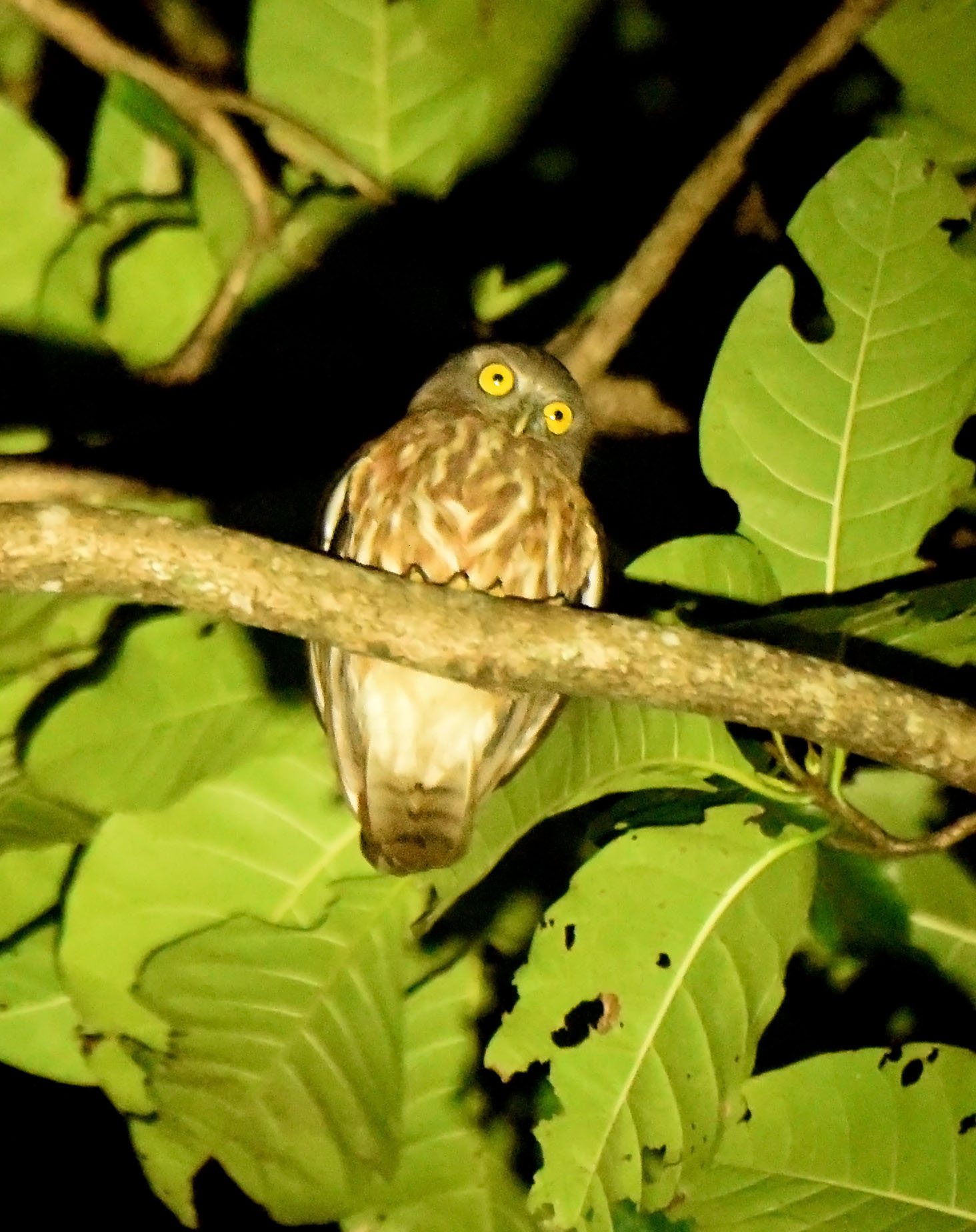
