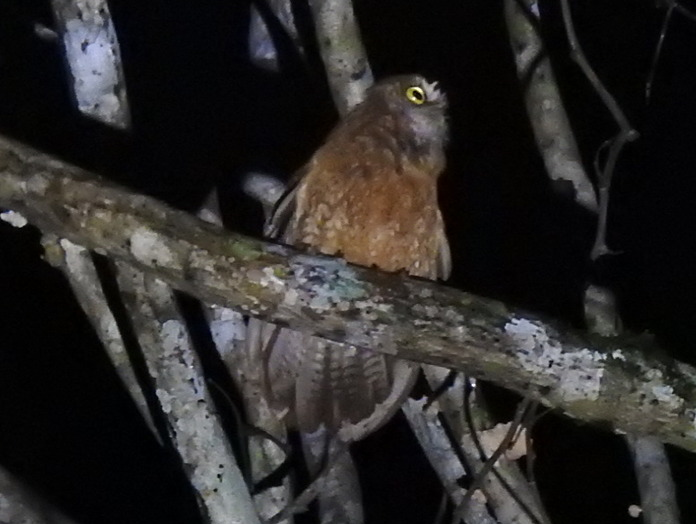

Conservation status
- Endangered (IUCN 3.1)
- CITES Appendix II

Scientific classification
- Kingdom: Animalia
- Phylum: Chordata
- Class: Aves
- Order: Strigiformes
- Family: Strigidae
- Genus: Ninox
- Species: N. sumbaensis

Binomial name
- Ninox sumbaensis Olsen, Wink, Sauer-Gürth & Trost, 2002

= Little Sumba boobook =

Species of owl

The little Sumba boobook (Ninox sumbaensis), also known as the least boobook or little Sumba hawk-owl, is a species of owl in the family Strigidae. It is endemic to the Indonesian island of Sumba. Its natural habitat is subtropical or tropical moist lowland forests. It is threatened by habitat loss.

== History ==
In the 1980s ornithologists knew that there was an unknown species of owl on the island of Sumba. A phylogenetic analysis undertaken on a sample feather showed that the owl was an unknown species in the genus Ninox. The bird had a characteristic low whistling call "who", repeated at four second intervals, which distinguished it from other known species of owl. When this call was recorded and played back on Sumba, there was a response from resident birds. In late 2001 a specimen of the bird was obtained, enabling a detailed description to be made for the first time; it was named Ninox sumbaensis, the little Sumba boobook.

== Description ==
The little Sumba boobook is about 23 cm (9.1 in) long and weighs 90 g (3.2 oz). The head is grey with fine dark barring and distinctive white eyebrows but an indistinct facial disc. The beak is large and yellow, the eyes are yellow and there are no eartufts. The upper parts are light brown with widely separated, dark wavy markings and the underparts are whitish with fine dark chevrons. The tail is pale reddish-brown with dark barring. The legs and talons are yellow. This bird is smaller and has relatively longer wings than the Sumba boobook (Ninox rudolfi) which also occurs on the island.

== Ecology ==
Little is known about this bird. Several pairs have been observed in primary and secondary forest but not in the surrounding open terrain where the Sumba boobook hunts. The conservation status of this owl is assessed as being "Endangered" by the International Union for Conservation of Nature as it has a small range, a moderately small total population and is likely to be decreasing in abundance because of forest clearance.
