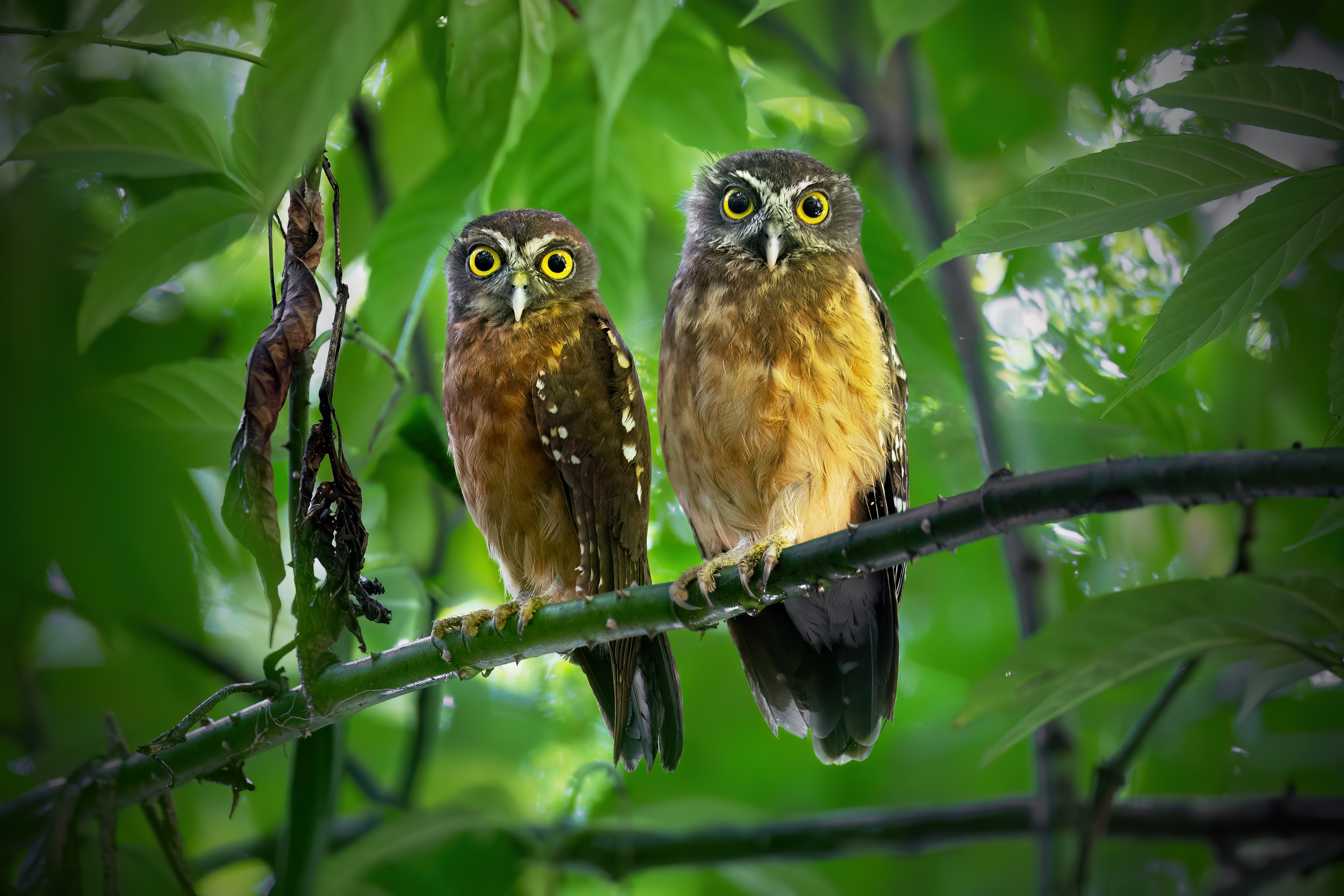

Conservation status
- Near Threatened (IUCN 3.1)
- CITES Appendix II

Scientific classification
- Kingdom: Animalia
- Phylum: Chordata
- Class: Aves
- Order: Strigiformes
- Family: Strigidae
- Genus: Ninox
- Species: N. ochracea

Binomial name
- Ninox ochracea (Schlegel, 1866)

= Ochre-bellied boobook =

Species of owl

The ochre-bellied boobook or ochre-bellied hawk owl (Ninox ochracea) is a species of owl in the family Strigidae. It is endemic to Sulawesi, Indonesia. Its natural habitats are subtropical or tropical dry forests and subtropical or tropical moist lowland forests. It is threatened by habitat loss.

It has unusually low barb density among owls.
