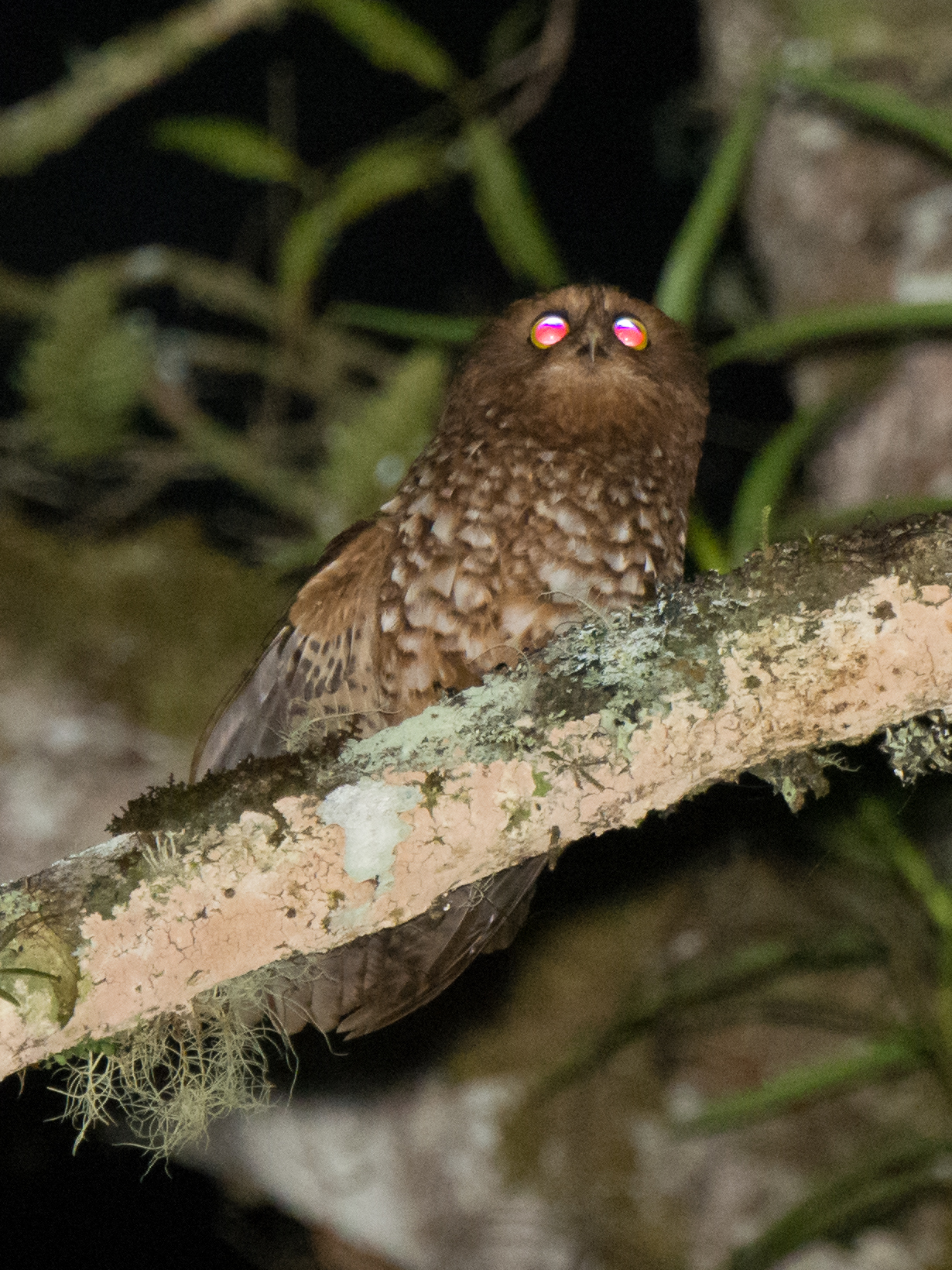

Conservation status
- Least Concern (IUCN 3.1)
- CITES Appendix II

Scientific classification
- Kingdom: Animalia
- Phylum: Chordata
- Class: Aves
- Order: Strigiformes
- Family: Strigidae
- Genus: Ninox
- Species: N. ios

Binomial name
- Ninox ios Rasmussen, 1999

= Cinnabar boobook =

Species of owl

The cinnabar boobook (Ninox ios), also known as the cinnabar hawk-owl, is a hawk-owl endemic to the island of Sulawesi, Indonesia.

== Description and distribution ==
The cinnabar boobook was described as a new species to science by American ornithologist Pamela C. Rasmussen in 1999 based on a single specimen collected by Frank Rozendaal from Bogani Nani Wartabone National Park on Minahassa Peninsula, northern Sulawesi, in 1985. Its taxonomic name comes from the Greek word ios (ἰός), meaning "rust," in reference to the color of its plumage. Subsequently, it has also been observed in Gunung Ambag Nature Reserve, also in northern Sulawesi, and in Lore Lindu National Park in central Sulawesi.

== Morphology ==
The cinnabar boobook is small with a total length of 22 cm (8.7 in). It has chestnut colored plumage with white markings on the scapulars and pale markings on the underbelly. It has pink orbital skin and yellow irises.

== Ecology and behavior ==
The four known records of the species indicate it is a nocturnal forest-dwelling species living at mid-altitudes of 1,100 to 1,700 m (3,600 to 5,600 ft). It spends most of its time in the middle or upper canopy.

The cinnabar boobook is an insectivore which catches insects in flight. It is capable of hovering for several seconds.

The call of the cinnabar boobook, was described by one researcher as "a dry, nasal, hissing, shriek," similar to that of a barn owl.
