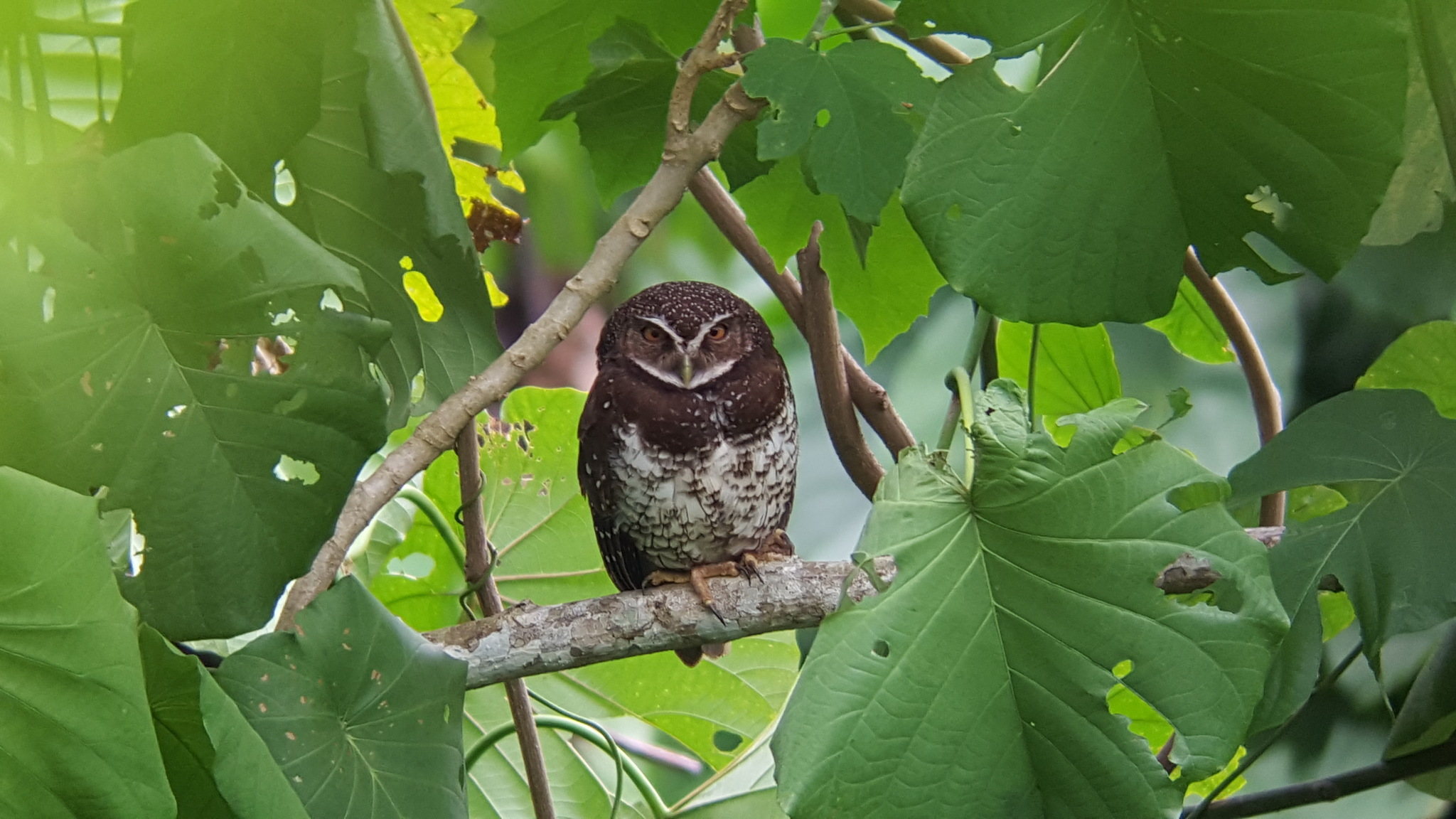

Conservation status
- Vulnerable (IUCN 3.1)
- CITES Appendix II (CITES)

Scientific classification
- Kingdom: Animalia
- Phylum: Chordata
- Class: Aves
- Order: Strigiformes
- Family: Strigidae
- Genus: Ninox
- Species: N. odiosa

Binomial name
- Ninox odiosa Sclater, PL, 1877

= New Britain boobook =

Species of owl

The New Britain boobook (Ninox odiosa), also known as the spangled boobook, russet boobook, New Britain hawk-owl or russet hawk-owl, is a small owl that is endemic to New Britain, the largest island in the Bismarck Archipelago in Papua New Guinea.

== Description ==
The New Britain boobook is a small owl that grows to a length of about 22 cm (9 in). It has finely spotted chocolate-brown plumage, golden eyes and white eyebrows. Its facial disk is brown while the upper breast is marked with a wide brown band with buff or white barrings. The underparts are densely spotted brown.

Its call is a series of rapidly repeated "whoo"s, starting at a low pitch which rises and becomes faster and louder.

== Distribution and habitat ==
This species is found in the lowlands and hills of the New Britain and New Ireland endemic bird areas at elevations of up to 1,200 m (3,940 ft) asl. It is fairly common in its small range and is nocturnal. It roosts during the day alone or in pairs in the middle to upper parts of the forest canopy. It feeds mainly on insects and small mammals.

== Conservation ==
Formerly classified as being a "Species of Least Concern" by the IUCN, the New Britain boobook was later suspected to be rarer than had previously been assumed because its rainforest habitat was being degraded by logging and forest clearance for conversion to oil palm plantations. Following the re-evaluation of its population size, this assumption was found to be correct and its numbers are now thought to be within the range of 10,000 to 20,000 individuals. Its total range is less than 30,000 km^{2} (11,580 sq mi) so its category was subsequently changed to "Vulnerable" status in 2008.
