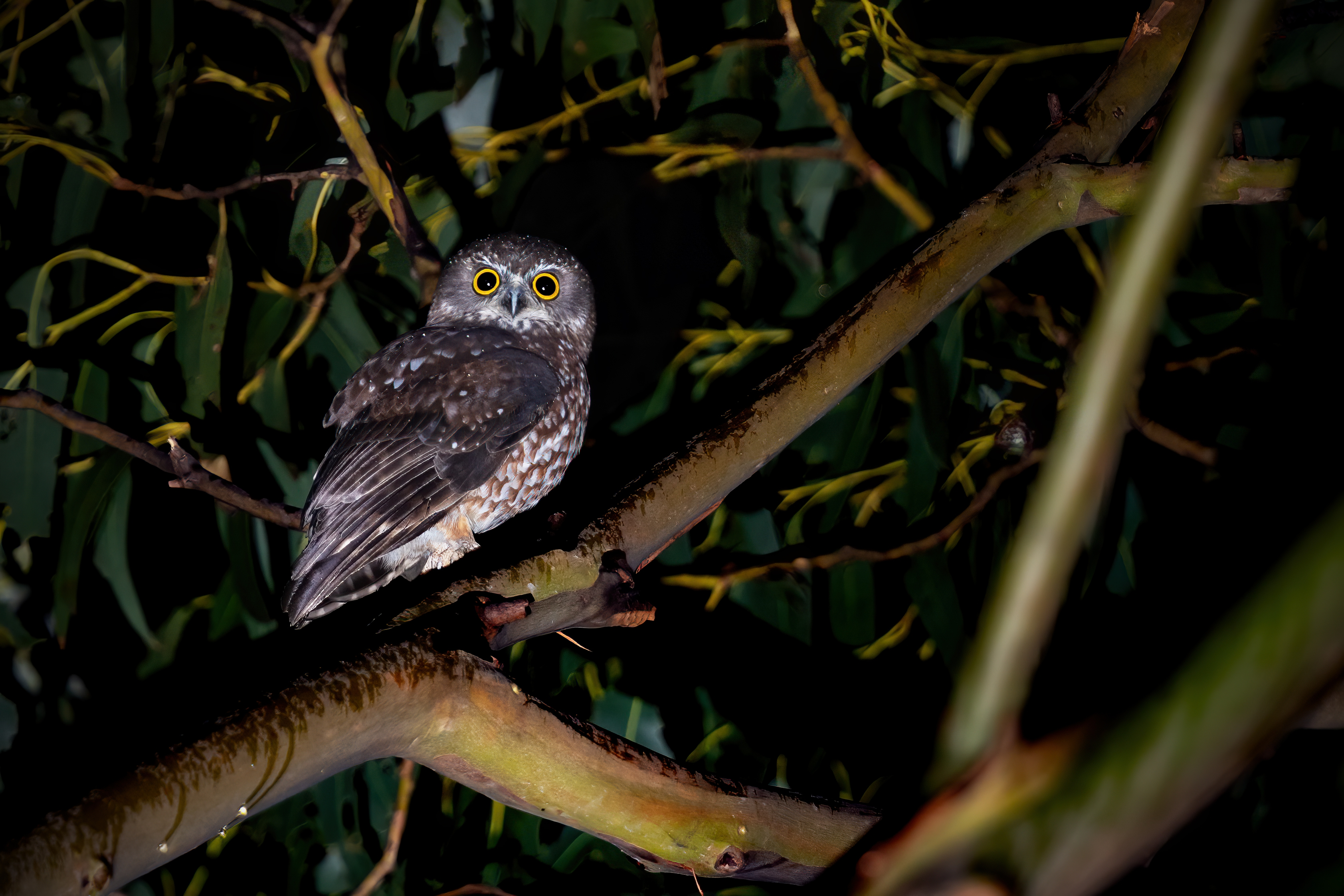

Conservation status
- Least Concern (IUCN 3.1)

Scientific classification
- Kingdom: Animalia
- Phylum: Chordata
- Class: Aves
- Order: Strigiformes
- Family: Strigidae
- Genus: Ninox
- Species: N. leucopsis

Binomial name
- Ninox leucopsis (Gould, 1838)

= Tasmanian boobook =

Species of owl

The Tasmanian boobook (Ninox leucopsis), also known as the Tasmanian spotted owl, is a species of owl in the family Strigidae. It is native to Tasmania.

Formerly considered conspecific with the morepork (N. novaeseelandiae), phylogenetic studies have affirmed its status as a distinct species by analyzing genetic and morphologic characteristics. It was reclassified as distinct by the International Ornithological Congress in 2022.

It is widespread in Tasmania and on King Island and other islands of Bass Strait. It has been recorded in southern Victoria, once from New South Wales, and once from Lord Howe Island. It predominantly occurs in eucalypt forests.

It is carnivorous, and a nest predator.

The Tasmanian boobook is sexually dimorphic, with males typically being smaller than females.

== Sources ==
- Higgins, P.J. (1999). Handbook of Australian, New Zealand and Antarctic Birds. Volume 4: Parrots to Dollarbird. Melbourne, Victoria: Oxford University Press. ISBN 0-19-553071-3.
