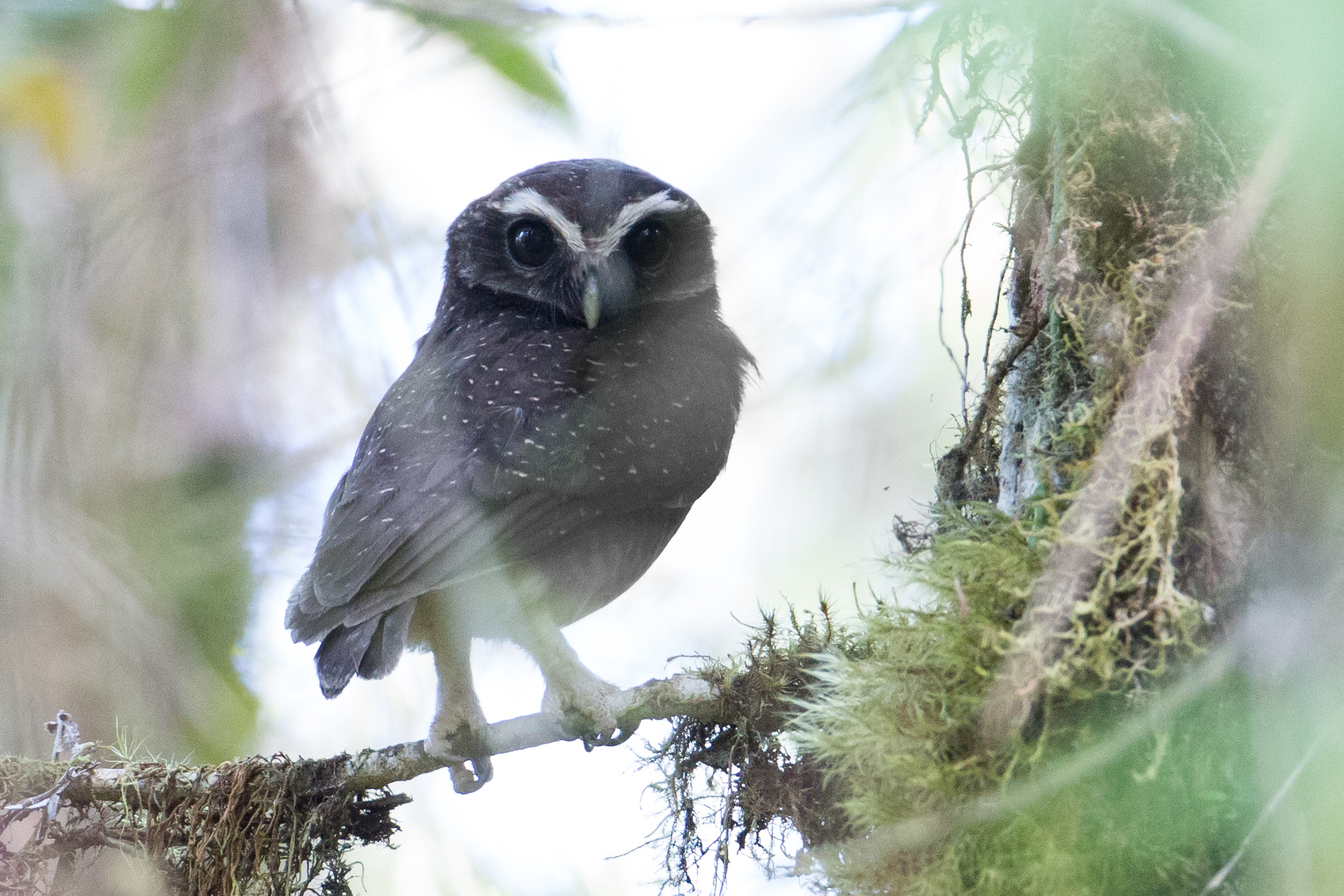

Conservation status
- Least Concern (IUCN 3.1)
- CITES Appendix II

Scientific classification
- Kingdom: Animalia
- Phylum: Chordata
- Class: Aves
- Order: Strigiformes
- Family: Strigidae
- Genus: Ninox
- Species: N. punctulata

Binomial name
- Ninox punctulata (Quoy & Gaimard, 1832)

= Speckled boobook =

Species of owl

Speckled Boobook in Sulawesi

The speckled boobook or speckled hawk owl (Ninox punctulata), also called the Oriental hawk-owl, is a small owl at 17–20 cm (6.7–7.9 in). It is a reddish-brown hawk-owl with a white-spotted head, back and wings, a white throat patch, black facial disk, dark brown eyes and white eyebrows.

This owl is found on the island of Sulawesi in Indonesia and lives mainly in forests near streams, open woodland, and cultivated regions with scattered trees. It is mainly found at altitudes lower than 1100 meters, but is occasionally seen at up to 2,300 m (7,500 ft) above sea level. It is fairly common throughout its range.
