= Manus boobook =

Conservation status
- Least Concern (IUCN 3.1)
- CITES Appendix II

Scientific classification
- Kingdom: Animalia
- Phylum: Chordata
- Class: Aves
- Order: Strigiformes
- Family: Strigidae
- Genus: Ninox
- Species: N. meeki

Binomial name
- Ninox meeki Rothschild & Hartert, 1914

Species of owl

The Manus boobook, Manus hawk owl, Admiralty hawk owl or Admiralty Islands hawk owl (Ninox meeki) is a small owl. It has an unmarked brown facial disk, rufous crown and back, barred white flight feathers and tail, and whitish underparts with rufous streaking. Its call is repeated growling, like that of a frog.

This species is endemic to Manus Island, in the Admiralty Islands. It lives mainly in forests, but will appear in trees near humans, and will sometimes occupy riparian habitats. It is fairly common throughout its limited range.

It is one of two species of owl on Manus Island.
