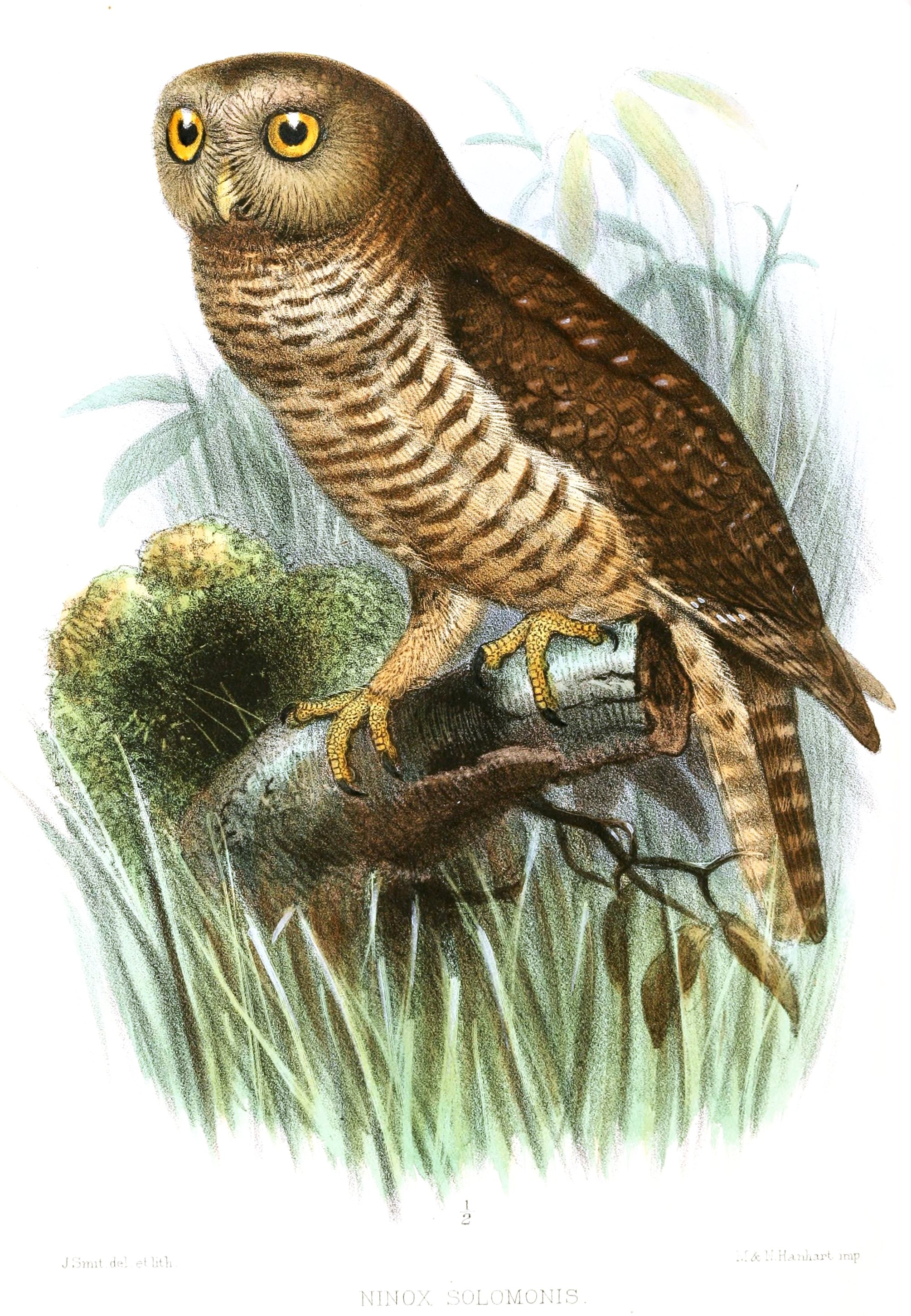

Conservation status
- Least Concern (IUCN 3.1)
- CITES Appendix II (CITES)

Scientific classification
- Kingdom: Animalia
- Phylum: Chordata
- Class: Aves
- Order: Strigiformes
- Family: Strigidae
- Genus: Ninox
- Species: N. variegata

Binomial name
- Ninox variegata (Quoy & Gaimard, 1832)

Synonyms
- Noctua variegata (Quoy and Gaimard, 1830); Ninox solomonis (Sharpe, 1876)

= New Ireland boobook =

Species of owl

The New Ireland boobook or New Ireland hawk owl (Ninox variegata) also known as the Bismarck boobook, Bismarck hawk owl or barred boobook, is a small to medium-sized owl measuring 25 to 30 cm (9.8 to 11.8 in) in length. It is a dark rufous-brown above, with barred scapular feathers and variable amounts of spotting or barring on the wings and tail. Its underparts are whitish, with an unmarked pale throat, a dark barred upper breast and barring on the remainder of the underparts. Its face is dark brown, its eyes are brown or yellow, and its bill and legs are yellow. It is short-tailed and has heavy tarsi (the part of the leg above what is commonly referred to as the foot).

Endemic to the Bismarck archipelago, it occurs on the islands of New Britain, New Ireland and New Hanover, where it lives in forested lowlands, hills and mountains, up to an altitude of 1,000 m (3,300 ft).

It was first described as Noctua variegata by French naturalists Jean René Constant Quoy and Joseph Paul Gaimard in 1830.

Although its population size has not been quantified, it is widespread and fairly common in forest and forest edges within its range, and its numbers are thought to be stable. Deforestation is thought to be a likely threat to the species.
