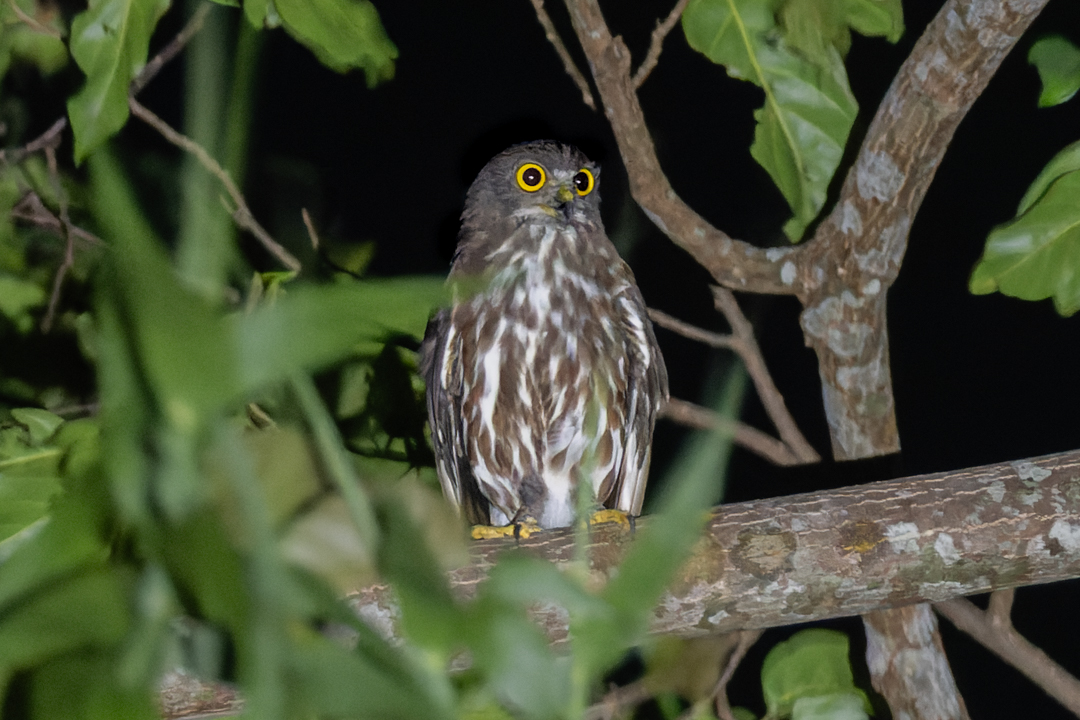

Conservation status
- Near Threatened (IUCN 3.1)
- CITES Appendix II

Scientific classification
- Kingdom: Animalia
- Phylum: Chordata
- Class: Aves
- Order: Strigiformes
- Family: Strigidae
- Genus: Ninox
- Species: N. randi

Binomial name
- Ninox randi Deignan, 1951

Synonyms
- Ninox scutulata randi

= Chocolate boobook =

Species of owl

The chocolate boobook (Ninox randi) is a bird species in the true owl family, Strigidae. It was formerly considered to be a subspecies of the brown boobook and thought to be endemic to the Philippines until it was heard and recorded Karakelang in Indonesia in 1997 but there have been no subsequent records outside the Philippines since.

== Description and taxonomy ==
It is part of the Brown boobook species complex but is differentiated by voice and its body measurements.

It is monotypic and has no subspecies.

== Ecology and behavior ==
Diet is unknown but presumed to be the typical boobook diet of insects and small vertebrates. Nothing is known about its breeding habits except a young individual was found in June. It is pressumed to be a cavity nester.

== Habitat and conservation status ==
This species habitat is in primary lowland rainforest, second-growth forest and mangroves up to 1,000 meters above sea level. It is not tolerant of cultivated areas and human habitated areas.

IUCN has assessed this bird as near-threatened species with the population believed to be declining due to deforestation in the Philippines continues throughout the country due to slash and burn farming, mining, illegal logging and habitat conversion. It is also occasionally caught for the pet trade or for bushmeat.

It is found in multiple protected areas such as Pasonanca Natural Park, Rajah Sikatuna Protected Landscape and Bataan National Park but like all areas in the Philippines, protection is lax and deforestation continues despite this protection on paper.
