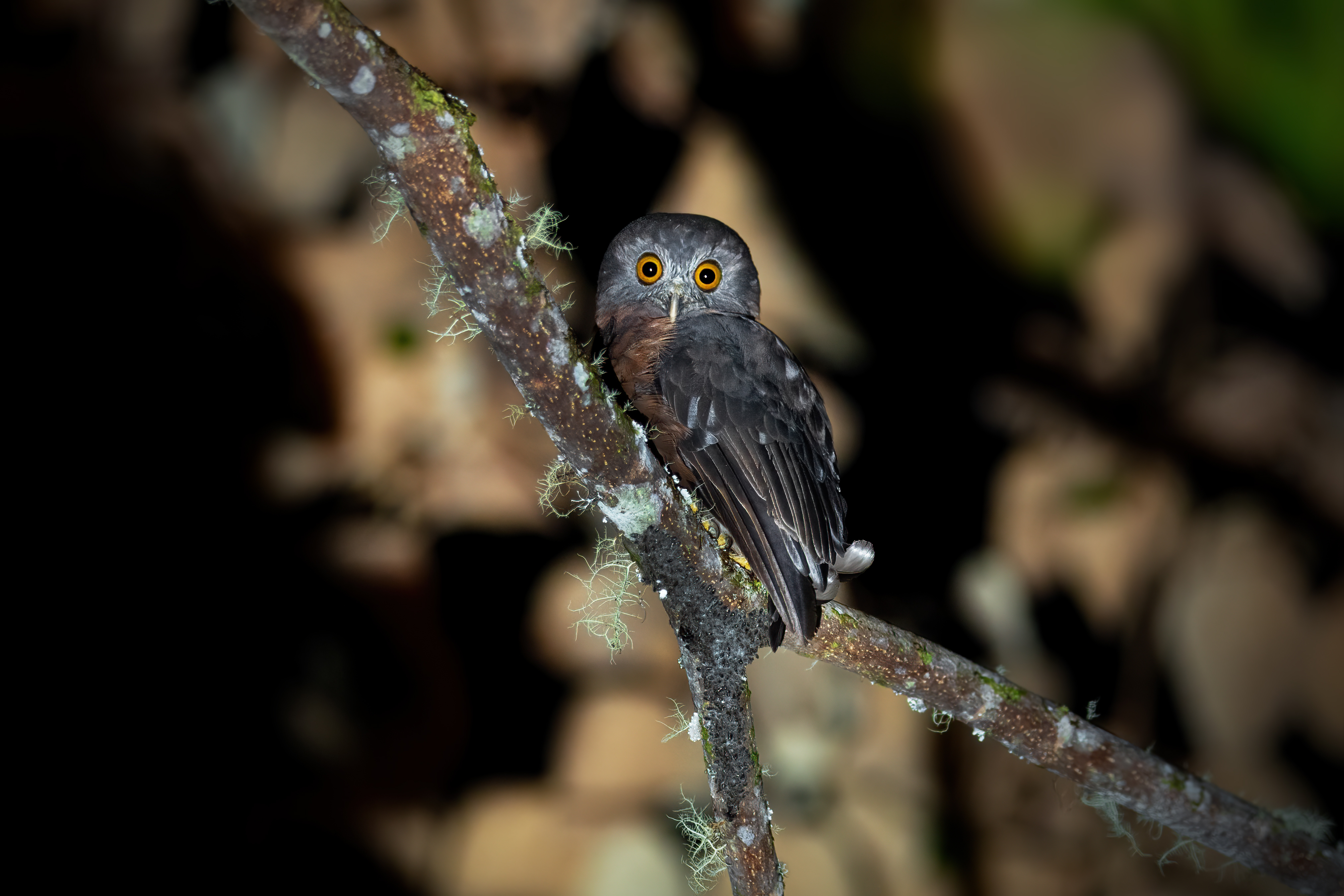

Conservation status
- Least Concern (IUCN 3.1)
- CITES Appendix II (CITES)

Scientific classification
- Kingdom: Animalia
- Phylum: Chordata
- Class: Aves
- Order: Strigiformes
- Family: Strigidae
- Genus: Ninox
- Species: N. theomacha

Binomial name
- Ninox theomacha (Bonaparte, 1855)

= Papuan boobook =

Species of owl

The Papuan boobook (Ninox theomacha), jungle boobook or jungle hawk owl, is a medium-sized, dark-colored owl. It has a dark gray-brown facial disk with lighter colored eyebrows, sooty or chocolate underparts, and mainly dark gray wings.

It lives mainly in lowland forests, montane forests, and submontane forests, mainly on the forests' edges. It is native to New Guinea.

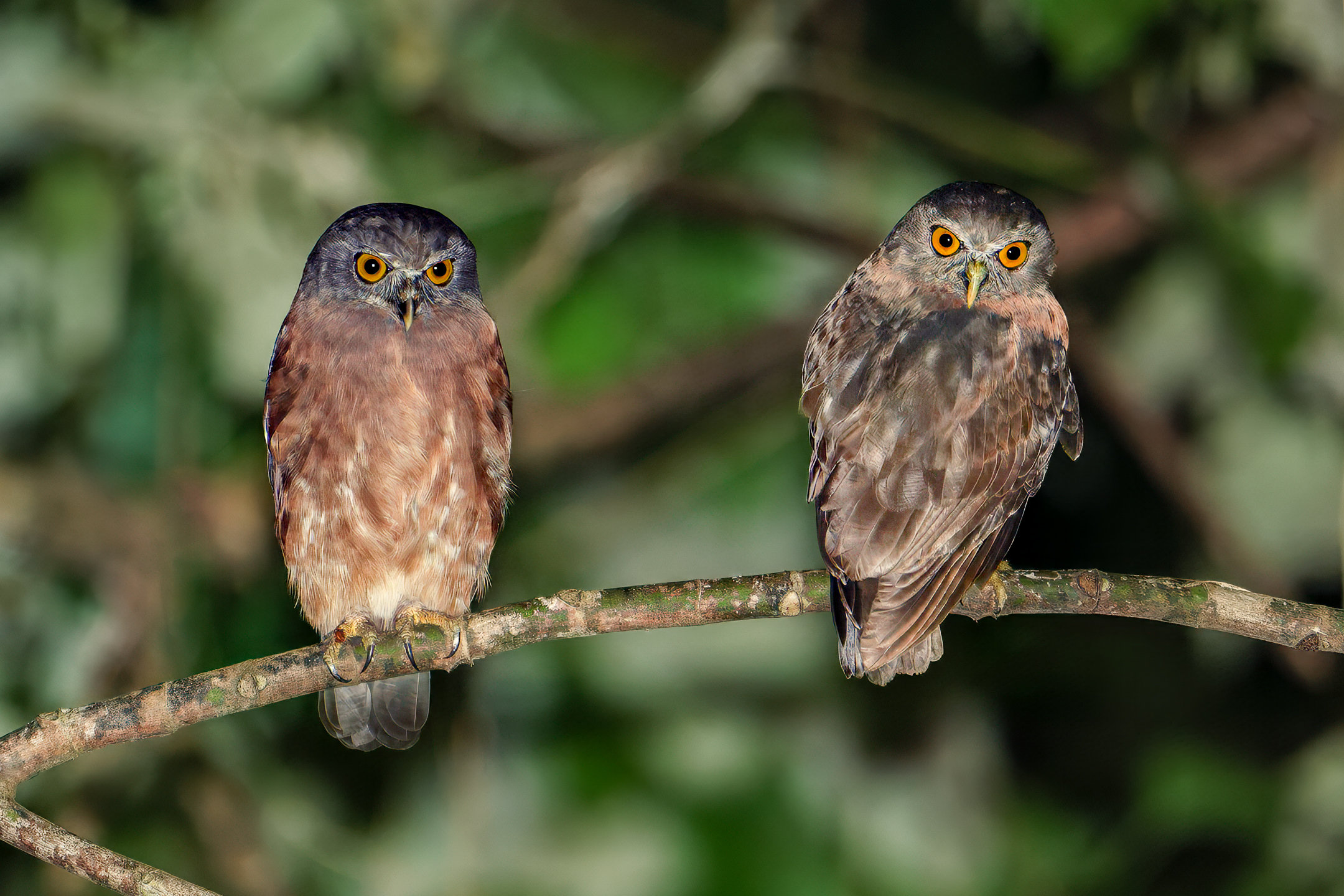
Papuan boobook pair

== Uses of the name ==
The Jungle Hawk Owl is the name of a long-endurance unmanned aerial vehicle developed by students at MIT.
