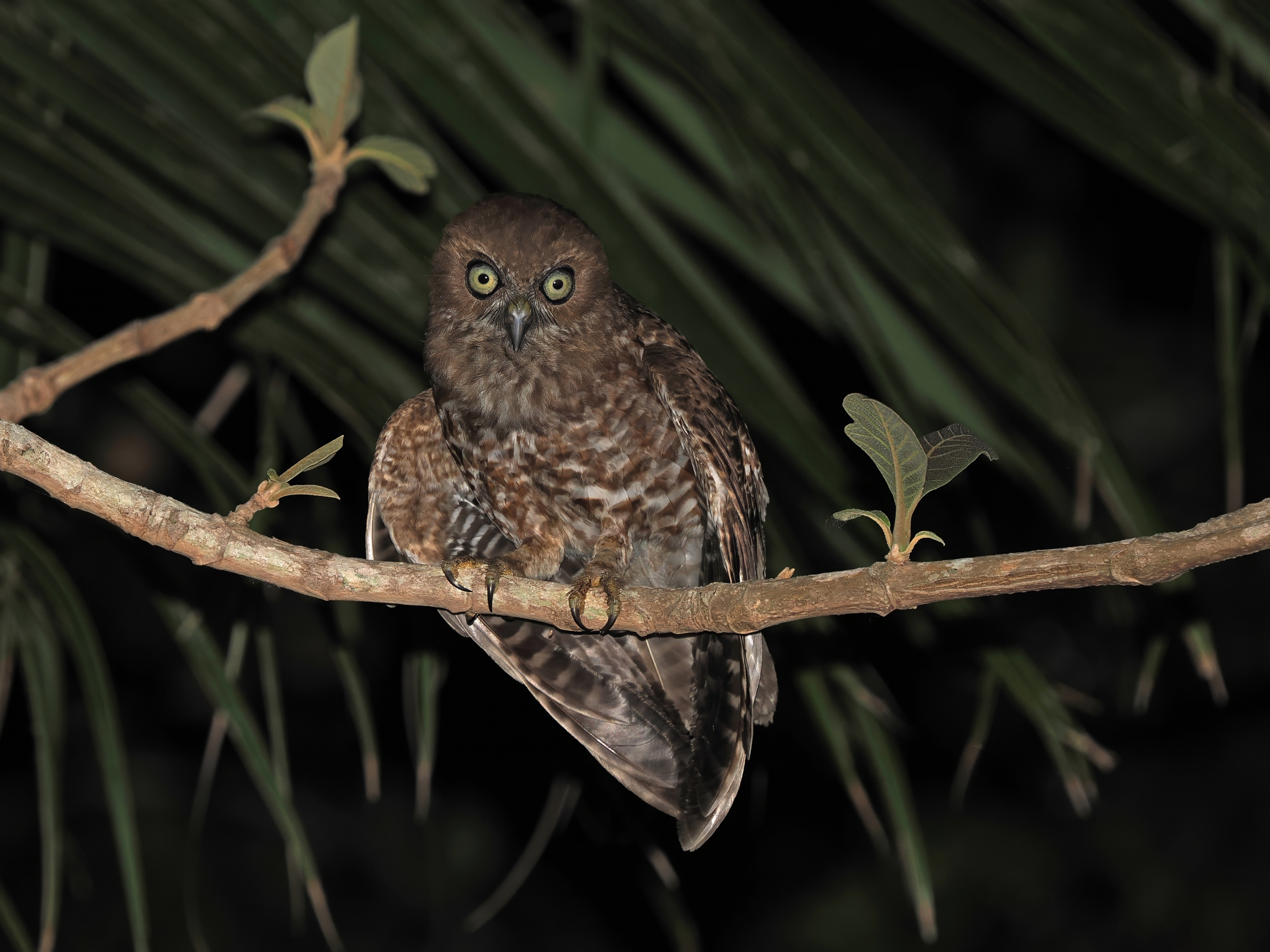

Conservation status
- CITES Appendix II
- Least Concern (IUCN 3.1)

Scientific classification
- Kingdom: Animalia
- Phylum: Chordata
- Class: Aves
- Order: Strigiformes
- Family: Strigidae
- Genus: Ninox
- Species: N. plesseni

Binomial name
- Ninox plesseni Stresemann, 1929

= Alor boobook =

Species of owl

The Alor boobook (Ninox plesseni) is a species of owl in the family Strigidae. It is native to Pantar and Alor Islands in the eastern Lesser Sunda Islands.

It was previously considered a subspecies of the Australian boobook, before being reclassified as its own species due to bioacoustic data in 2017.
