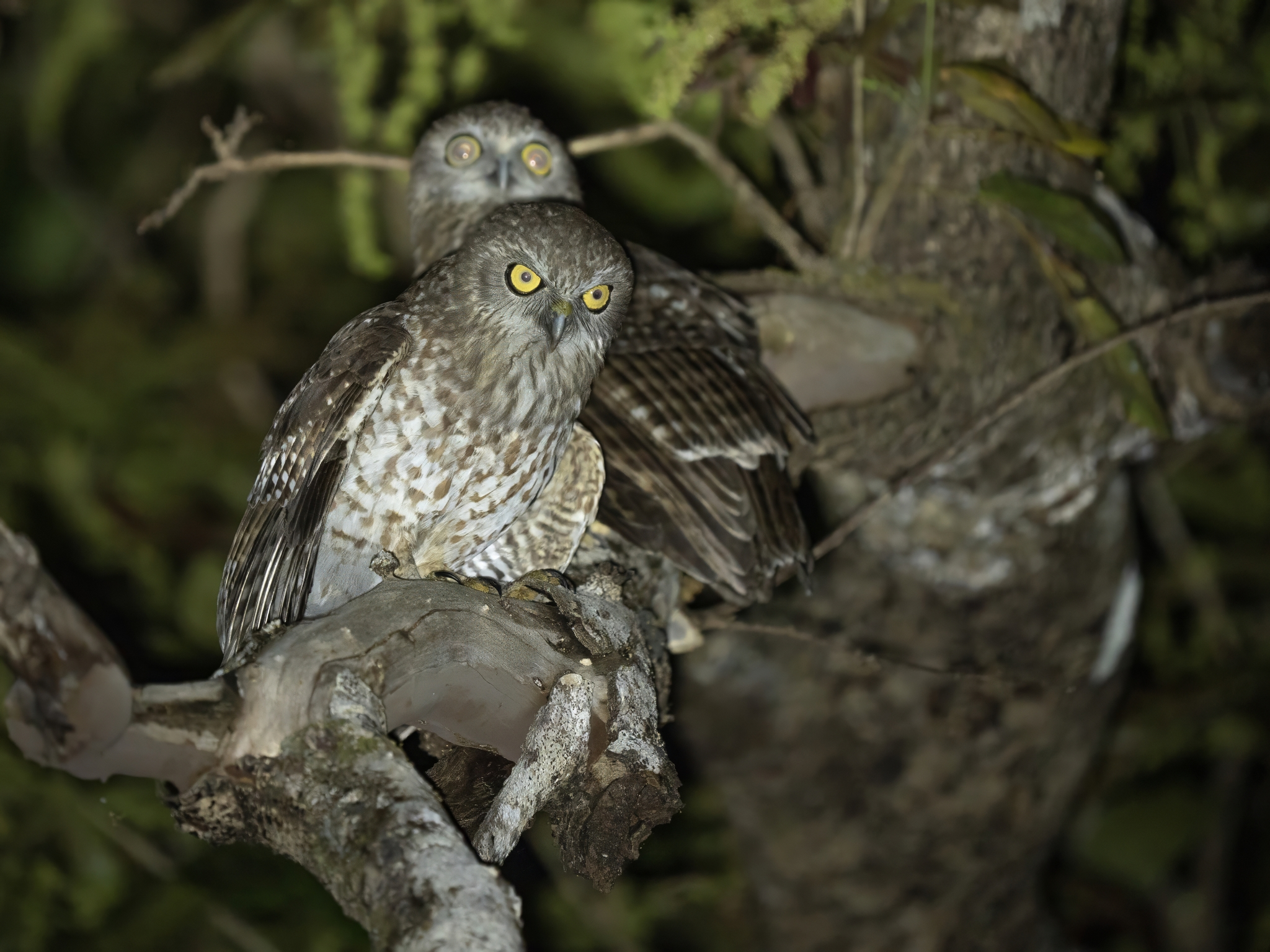

Conservation status
- Near Threatened (IUCN 3.1)
- CITES Appendix II

Scientific classification
- Kingdom: Animalia
- Phylum: Chordata
- Class: Aves
- Order: Strigiformes
- Family: Strigidae
- Genus: Ninox
- Species: N. rotiensis

Binomial name
- Ninox rotiensis Johnstone & Darnell, JC, 1997

= Rote boobook =

Species of owl

The Rote boobook (Ninox rotiensis) is a species of owl in the family Strigidae. It is endemic to Rote Island in the Lesser Sunda Islands of Indonesia.

It was first described in 1997 by Australian biologists Ronald Johnstone and J.C. Darnell from a female collected in a mist net in 1990. It is smaller than the Australian boobook, with heavily barred primaries, rump and tail. Locally common, it is known as Tuterui and Kokorok in Landu and Oelaba localities respectively on the island. Genetic and call analysis show it to be markedly divergent from the Australian populations of the Australian boobook, leading Gwee and colleagues to suggest it be reclassified as a separate species, which duly happened in 2019.
