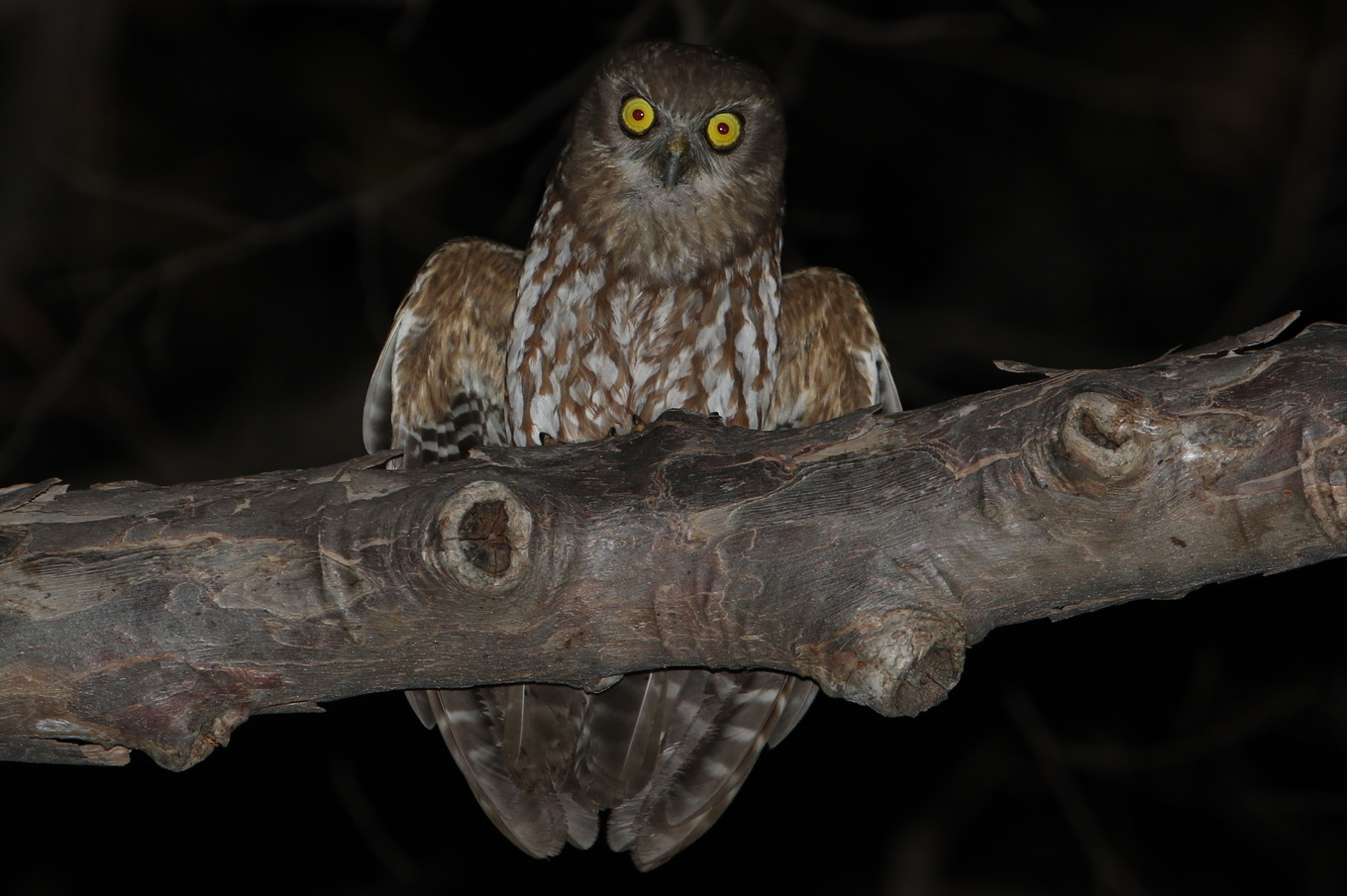

Conservation status
- CITES Appendix II

Scientific classification
- Kingdom: Animalia
- Phylum: Chordata
- Class: Aves
- Order: Strigiformes
- Family: Strigidae
- Genus: Ninox
- Species: N. fusca

Binomial name
- Ninox fusca (Vieillot, 1817)

= Timor boobook =

Species of owl

The Timor boobook (Ninox fusca) is a species of owl in the family Strigidae. It is found on Timor, Roma, Leti and Semau islands in the eastern Lesser Sunda Islands.

It has a more grey-brown plumage with no red tinge, unlike other subspecies. It has grey streaks on its belly and white spots on its secondaries, inner wing-coverts and nape. It was described by French ornithologist Louis Pierre Vieillot in 1817 as Strix fusca. Austrian ornithologist Carl Eduard Hellmayr noted that it closely resembled the Australian boobook and concluded it was probably a subspecies of the latter, and Mayr classified it as a subspecies in 1943. Genetic and call analysis show it to be markedly divergent to the Australian populations of the Australian boobook, leading Gwee and colleagues to suggest it be reclassified as a separate species. Its calls are shorter and more frequent than the Australian boobook. It was reclassified as a distinct species in 2019.
