= Christmas boobook =

Conservation status
- Vulnerable (IUCN 3.1)
- CITES Appendix I

Scientific classification
- Kingdom: Animalia
- Phylum: Chordata
- Class: Aves
- Order: Strigiformes
- Family: Strigidae
- Genus: Ninox
- Species: N. natalis

Binomial name
- Ninox natalis Lister, 1889

Synonyms
- Ninox forbesi natalis

Species of owl

The Christmas boobook (Ninox natalis), also known as the Christmas hawk owl, Christmas Island boobook or Christmas Island hawk owl, is a species of owl in the family Strigidae.

Closely related to the hawk-owls of genus Ninox, which occur in Southeast Asia and Australia, N. natalis was first classified at species level by J.J.Lister in 1888. It was not until 1998, however, that DNA testing confirmed its status as a separate species from other owls.

== Distribution ==
Ninox natalis is endemic to Christmas Island, a small Australian territory of about 135 square km situated in the Indian Ocean approximately 360 km (220 mi) south of Java.

The flora and fauna of the island face on-going threats from both human activity and introduced species of plants and animals. In addition to these threats, N. natalis is restricted to a small range on this small island and is consequently listed as vulnerable by the IUCN.

Phosphate mining has continued for over a century and more recently Australian Immigration Detention Facilities have been established increasing the impact from human habitation. However, the Australian National Parks and Wildlife Service manage 64% of the island as a national park.

== Description ==
The Christmas Island hawk-owl is a small, rufous-brown hawk-owl with a barred breast, dark chestnut facial mask, whitish brow, lores and throat, yellow eyes, legs and feet. It is approximately 26–29 cm in length and 130-190 grams in weight with the female slightly larger than the male.

Its double-noted hoot, boo-book, has a clucking quality with the second note usually lower in pitch. The begging call of juveniles is a high-pitched trill.

Vocalisations are similar to those described for the Australian boobook (Ninox boobook) and include individual variation in advertisement calls. This may be useful in estimating owl densities as radio-tracking can be impractical in some terrains.

== Habitat ==
Its natural habitats are subtropical or tropical moist lowland forest and subtropical or tropical moist shrubland.

Ninox natalis occupies essentially exclusive territories and is widespread on the island utilizing both primary and disturbed habitats. However, in areas of regrowth significantly fewer birds have been detected. In 1995 there were approximately 560 breeding pairs, but by 2004 the population was estimated to be down to 1000 birds. A more recent estimate in 2011 suggests that the population may, however, be significantly lower than that.

Preferred roost sites are sheltered and concealed positions from which they can easily escape such as in the bottom third of the canopy of trees with deep crowns and mid-level understory but with fewer low understory trees.

Nests have been found in tree hollows predominantly in the canopies of Planchonella nitida, Hernandia ovigera and Syzygium nervosum.

== Diet ==
Primarily insectivorous they consume medium to large insects, particularly beetles (Coleoptera), tree crickets (Gryllacris rufovaria), moths (Lepidoptera) and introduced cockroaches (Periplaneta americana). They also supplement this with vertebrates such as the Christmas Island white-eye (Zosterops natalis), geckos including the introduced house gecko (Hemidactylus frenatus), and the introduced black rat (Rattus rattus).

== Threats ==
Man-made habitat destruction together with the introduction of species such as the yellow crazy ant (Anoplolepis gracillipes), cats (Felis catus) and black rats are among the major threats to both the habitat and native wildlife, including the Christmas Island hawk-owl.

The yellow crazy ant Anoplolepis gracilipes, an invasive introduction, disrupts the habitat in a number of ways, but most notably through their elimination of populations of the island's keystone species the red crab (Gecarcoidea natalis) resulting in significant changes to forest composition. In addition, the ants mutually-beneficial relationship with scale insects has contributed to degradation of the canopy. It is thought that yellow crazy ants may also prey on nestlings.

While mining has largely ended, various programmes to monitor and control introduced species are on-going.
