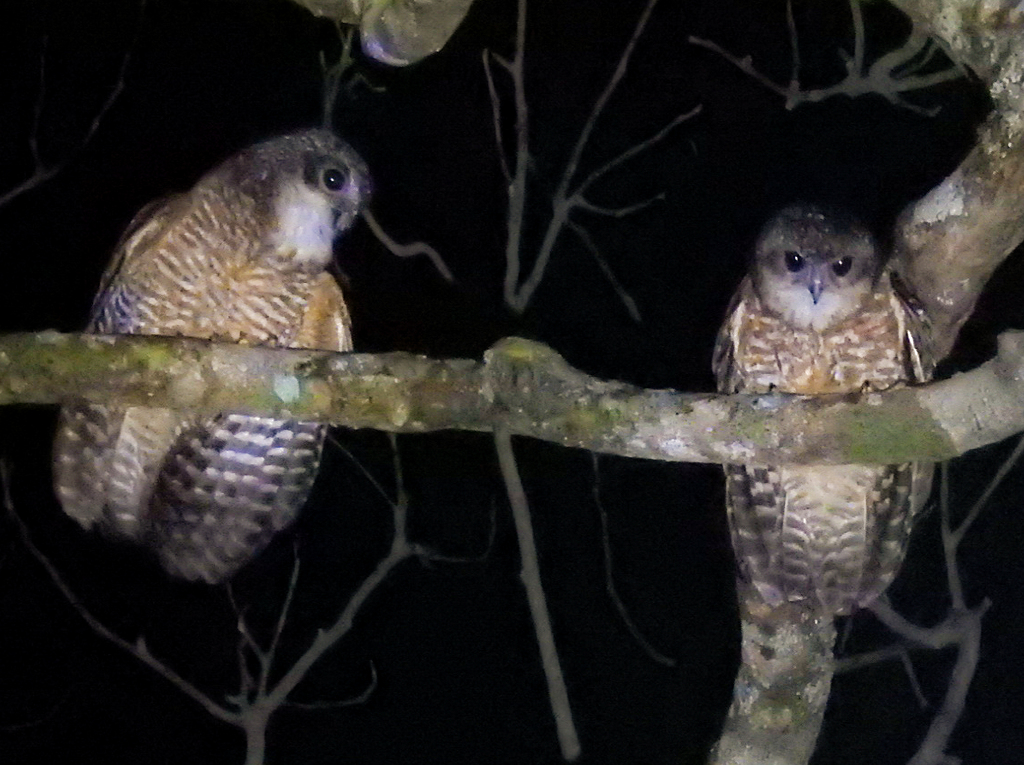

Conservation status
- Near Threatened (IUCN 3.1)
- CITES Appendix II

Scientific classification
- Kingdom: Animalia
- Phylum: Chordata
- Class: Aves
- Order: Strigiformes
- Family: Strigidae
- Genus: Ninox
- Species: N. rudolfi

Binomial name
- Ninox rudolfi Meyer, 1882

= Great Sumba boobook =

Species of owl

The great Sumba boobook (Ninox rudolfi) is a species of owl in the family Strigidae. It is endemic to Sumba in the Lesser Sunda Islands of Indonesia. Its natural habitats are subtropical or tropical dry forest and subtropical or tropical moist lowland forest. It is threatened by habitat loss.
