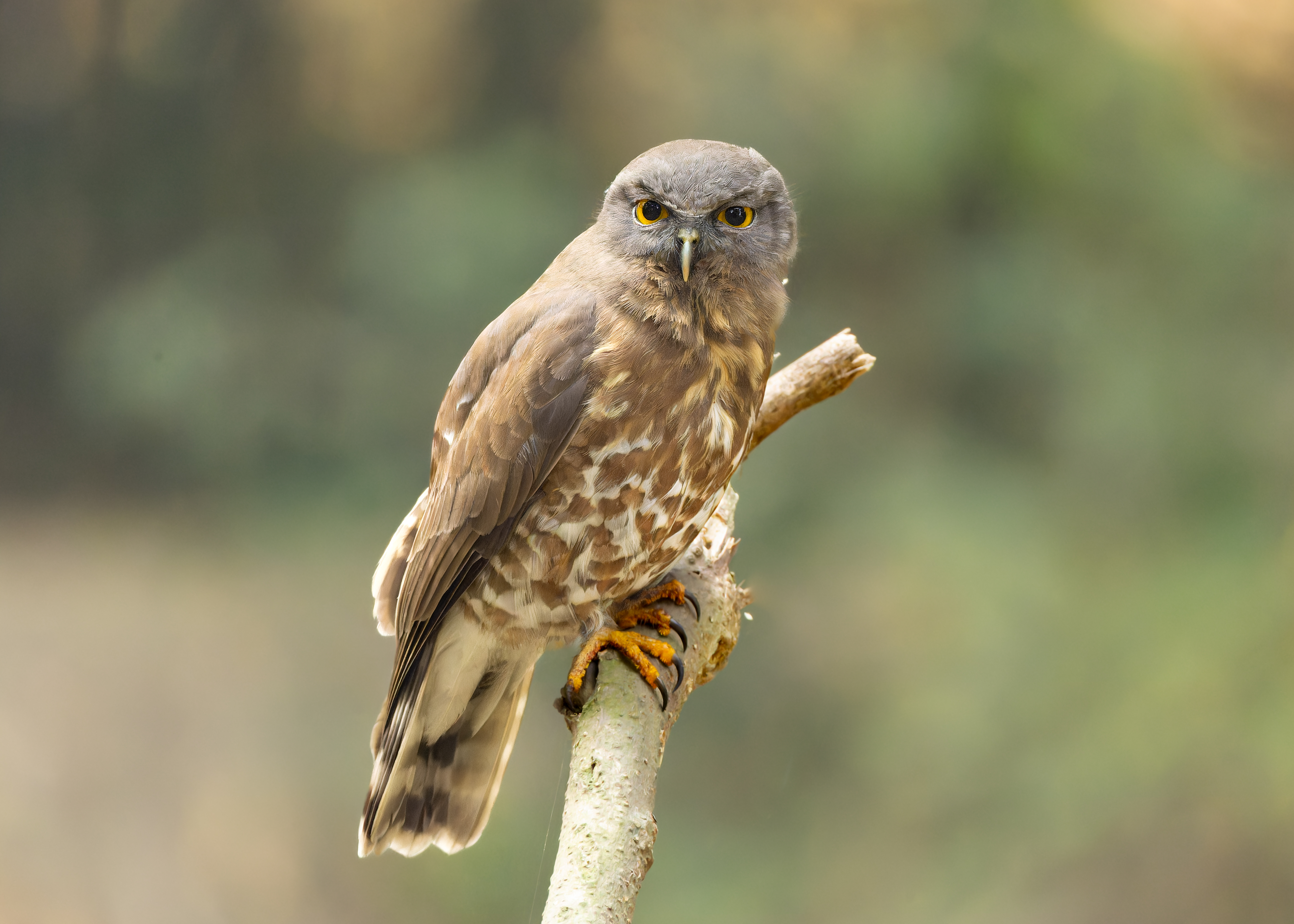
- In Purbasthali, West Bengal, India

Conservation status
- Least Concern (IUCN 3.1)
- CITES Appendix II

Scientific classification
- Kingdom: Animalia
- Phylum: Chordata
- Class: Aves
- Order: Strigiformes
- Family: Strigidae
- Genus: Ninox
- Species: N. scutulata

Binomial name
- Ninox scutulata (Raffles, 1822)

= Brown boobook =

Species of owl

Brown boobook in Kuldiha Wildlife Sanctuary, Odisha, India

The brown boobook (Ninox scutulata), also known as the brown hawk-owl, is a typical owl species. It has dark brown upperparts, whitish underparts with reddish-brown streaking, and a barred tail. It is a resident breeder in India, Nepal, Bangladesh, Bhutan, Sri Lanka, southern China and western Indonesia.

== Taxonomy ==
The brown boobook was formally described in 1822 by Stamford Raffles from a specimen collected in Sumatra under the binomial name Strix scutulata. The specific epithet is from Latin scutulatus meaning "diamond-shaped". The brown boobook is now placed with the other boobooks in the genus Ninox that was introduced by Brian Houghton Hodgson in 1837.

Nine subspecies are recognised:

- N. s. scutulata (Raffles, 1822) in the Malay Peninsula, Riau Archipelago, Sumatra and Bangka Island
- N. s. hirsuta (Temminck, 1824) in south India and Sri Lanka
- N. s. lugubris (Tickell, 1833) in north, northeast, central India and Nepal
- N. s. borneensis (Bonaparte, 1850) in Borneo and north Natuna Islands
- N. s. burmanica Hume, 1876in northeast India to south China, Indochina and Thailand
- N. s. isolata Baker, ECS, 1926 in Car Nicobar
- N. s. javanensis Stresemann, 1928 in west Java
- N. s. palawanensis Ripley & Rabor, 1962in Palawan
- N. s. rexpimenti Abdulali, 1979 in Great Nicobar Island

== Description ==
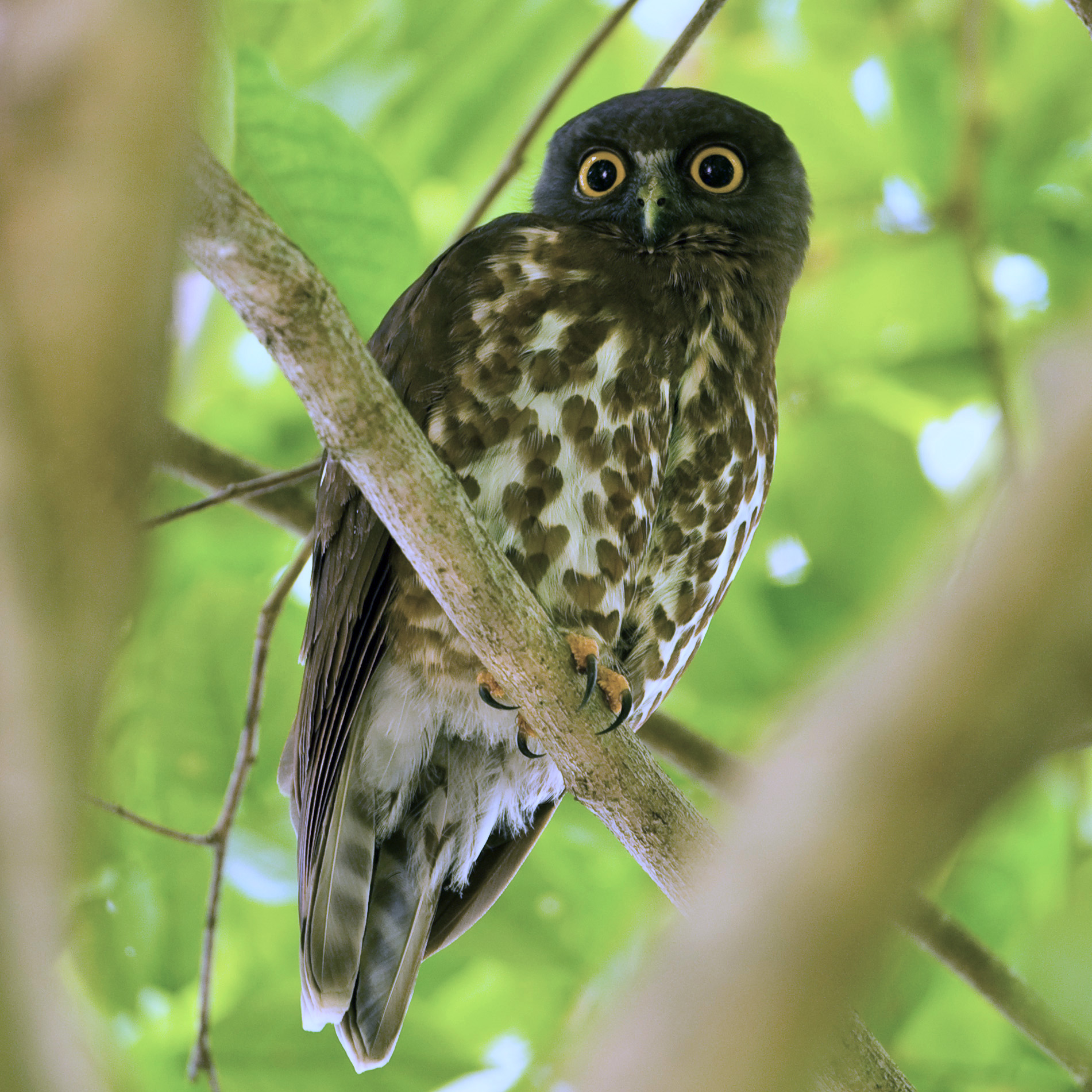
Brown boobook in Phuket, Thailand

Brown boobook call

The brown boobook is a medium-sized owl with a length of 32 cm (13 in). It has a hawk-like shape due to its long tail and lack of a distinct facial disk. The upperparts are dark brown, with a barred tail. The underparts are whitish with reddish-brown streaking, although the subspecies found in the Andaman Islands has dark brown underparts. The eyes are large and yellow. Sexes are similar. The call is a repeated low soft, musical oo-uk ...ooo-uk.. .

== Distribution and habitat ==
The brown boobook is a resident breeder in most of tropical south Asia from the Middle East to south China. Its habitat is well-wooded country and forest. It lays three to five eggs in a tree hole.

There are two records of the brown boobook in the western hemisphere: an individual photographed on St. Paul Island, Alaska, on August 27, 2007, and a dead owl found on Kiska Island in 2008.

The brown boobook is common in towns and cities like Colombo, Sri Lanka, as well as suburban areas close to buildings.

== Behaviour and ecology ==
The brown boobook is nocturnal but it can often be located by the small birds that mob it while it is roosting in a tree. It feeds mainly on large insects, frogs, lizards, small birds, and mice. It may be heard at dusk and dawn.
