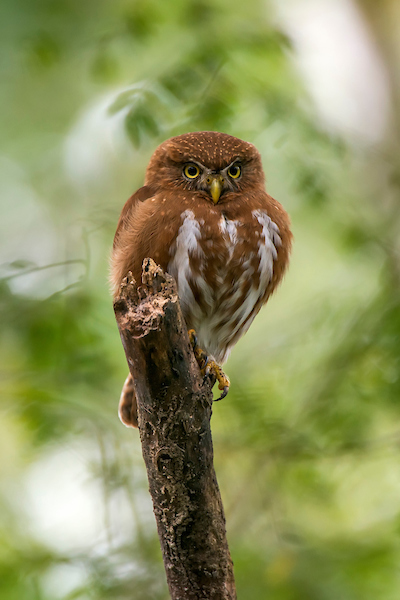

Conservation status
- Least Concern (IUCN 3.1)
- CITES Appendix II (CITES)

Scientific classification
- Kingdom: Animalia
- Phylum: Chordata
- Class: Aves
- Order: Strigiformes
- Family: Strigidae
- Genus: Glaucidium
- Species: G. minutissimum

Binomial name
- Glaucidium minutissimum (Wied-Neuwied, 1830)
- Distribution of East Brazilian pygmy owl Resident

Synonyms
- Glaucidium sicki; Strix pumila Temminck, 1821; Strix minutissima (Wied),1830

= East Brazilian pygmy owl =

Species of owl

The East Brazilian pygmy owl (Glaucidium minutissimum), also known as least pygmy-owl or Sick's pygmy-owl, is a small owl in the typical owl family.

== Taxonomy ==
It has been argued that the scientific name used here actually belongs to the Pernambuco pygmy owl, in which case the East Brazilian pygmy owl should be referred to as G. sicki (König & Weick, 2005). This has not gained widespread recognition.

Formerly, this species included the Colima pygmy owl, Tamaulipas pygmy owl, Central American pygmy owl, subtropical pygmy owl, and Baja pygmy owl as subspecies.

== Distribution ==
This species has a large range. It can be found in southeastern Brazil and easternmost Paraguay.

== Habitat ==
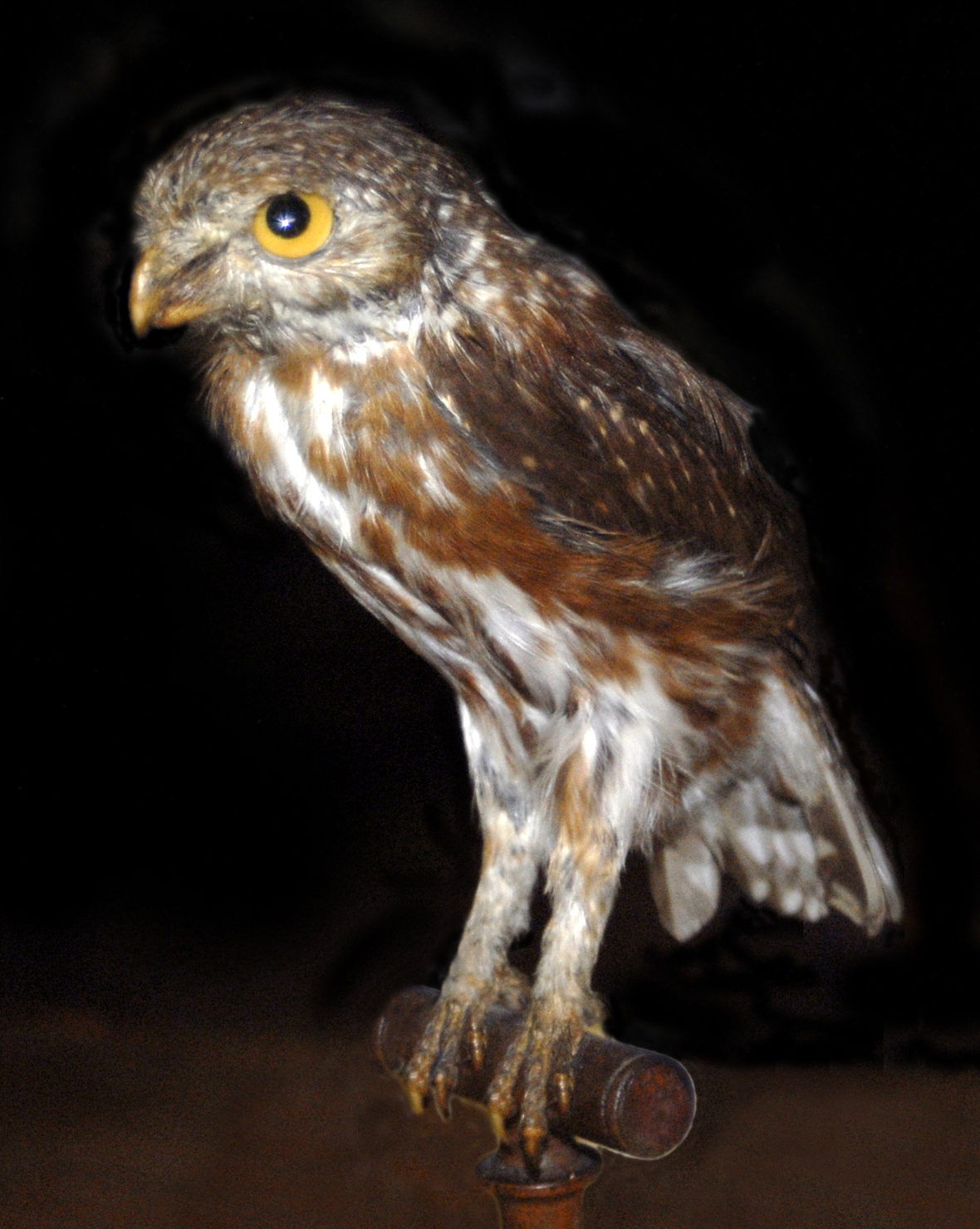
Glaucidium minutissimum. Museum specimen

It inhabits tropical and subtropical moist evergreen forests and edges as well as open bush canopy.

== Description ==
It is one of the smallest South American owls, averaging at 55 g (1.9 oz) and 15 cm (5.9 in) tall. Wing length can reach 85–91 mm (3.3–3.6 in), while the tail can reach a length of 49–54 mm (1.9–2.1 in). The head is rounded, with no ear tufts. The pale greyish-brown facial disk is not pronounced and shows some rufous concentric lines. The eyes are yellow, with whitish eyebrows. The upper part of the body is relatively dark, rufous-brown with small white spots. Wings are dark brown and relatively short. The tail is dark brown with five pale bars. The lower part of the body is light gray or white, with reddish-brown stripes. The throat shows a rounded whitish area. The legs are feathered, with bristled and yellowish toes. Claws are horn-colored with dark tips. The beak is yellow-green.

== Biology ==
The East Brazilian pygmy owl mainly feeds on small insects and sometimes catches small vertebrates. It is active at dusk and dawn, but occasionally hunts during the day. The song of the male is two to four long notes separated by short pauses.
