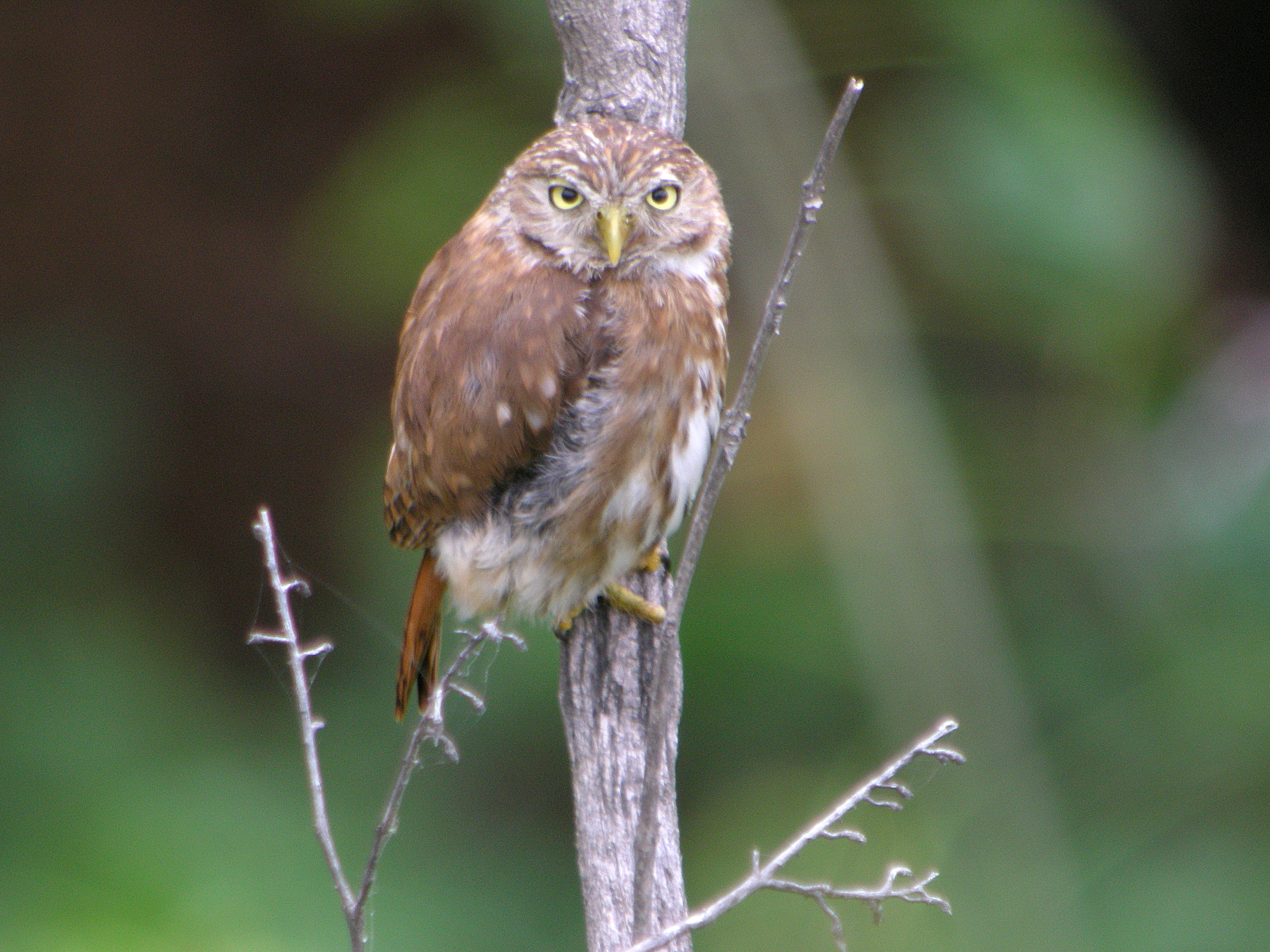

Conservation status
- Least Concern (IUCN 3.1)
- CITES Appendix II

Scientific classification
- Kingdom: Animalia
- Phylum: Chordata
- Class: Aves
- Order: Strigiformes
- Family: Strigidae
- Genus: Glaucidium
- Species: G. peruanum

Binomial name
- Glaucidium peruanum König, 1991
- Distribution of Pacific pygmy owl Resident

Audio
- Pacific pygmy owl call (Glaucidium peruanum) in Laquipampa Wildlife Refuge, Peru

= Pacific pygmy owl =

Species of owl

The Pacific pygmy owl (Glaucidium peruanum), or Peruvian pygmy owl, is a small "typical owl" in subfamily Surniinae. It is found in Chile, Ecuador, and Peru.

== Taxonomy and systematics ==
The Peruvian pygmy owl was first described as a species by Claus König, a German ornithologist, in 1991. Until then it had been treated as a subspecies of the widespread ferruginous pygmy owl (G. brasilianum). König separated the two primarily by their vocal differences; their ranges do not overlap. The Pacific pygmy owl is monotypic.

== Description ==
The Pacific pygmy owl is 15 to 17 cm (5.9 to 6.7 in) long. Males weigh about 60 g (2.1 oz) and females about 65 g (2.3 oz). In addition to being heavier, females also have slightly longer wings and tails than males, but both sexes have the same plumage. The species has gray, brown, and rufous color morphs, with the first two predominating. The upperparts of gray morph adults are grayish brown with buff streaks on the forecrown and buff spots on the crown and nape. An incomplete white "collar" and oval black spots on the neck give the appearance of eyes. The shoulders and back have whitish spots. The tail is also grayish brown, with up to seven whitish bars across it. The throat is white, the sides of the breast grayish brown, and the rest of the underparts whitish with rufuous streaks. The other morphs replace the grayish brown with dark brown or rufous respectively. In addition, the bars on the rufous morph's tail are rusty brown or orange-buff and the streaking on the underparts is more diffuse than on the other two morphs. In all morphs the eye is lemon yellow and the bill and feet yellow-green. Juveniles have essentially the same plumage as adults but their crown has no streaks or spots.

== Distribution and habitat ==
The Pacific pygmy owl is found on the western slope of the Andes from Manabí, Pichincha, and Los Ríos provinces in north-central Ecuador south through Peru into Chile as far as the Antofagasta Region. It also is found in several semiarid valleys within the western Andes. In Ecuador it usually occurs from sea level to 1,200 m (3,900 ft) of elevation but is locally found as high as 2,400 m (7,900 ft). In Peru it occurs up to 3,300 m (10,800 ft) and in Chile up to 3,500 m (11,500 ft). The species inhabits a variety of moist to arid landscapes including deciduous and riparian forest, arid lowland and montane scrublands, agricultural areas with large trees, and gardens in built-up areas.

== Behavior ==
=== Movement ===
The Pacific pygmy owl is a year-round resident throughout its range.

=== Feeding ===
The Pacific pygmy owl hunts both day and night, generally from the forest's mid-level to the canopy. Its diet has not been defined in detail but is known to include birds, small mammals and other vertebrates, and large arthropods.

=== Breeding ===
Almost nothing is known about the Pacific pygmy-owl's breeding phenology, although it is assumed to be like that of other members of genus Glaucidium. It is known to nest in tree cavities and has been recorded breeding in old nests of the pale-legged hornero (Furnarius leucopus) and in holes in walls and river banks.

=== Vocalization ===
The Pacific pygmy owl's song has been described as "a series of rapidly delivered pü notes" and also as "rapid...rising hoots: poop'poop'poop'poop....." It also makes "chirping and thin warbling notes." Vocal differences enable it to be separated from the similar Yungas pygmy owl (G. bolivianum) where their ranges overlap.

== Status ==
The IUCN has assessed the Pacific pygmy owl as being of Least Concern. It has a large range, and though its population size is not known it is believed to be stable. No specific threats have been identified. It is considered common in Ecuador and fairly common to common in Peru. "It tolerates human presence, as long as cavities are available for nesting, and even occurs in town plazas and in gardens."
