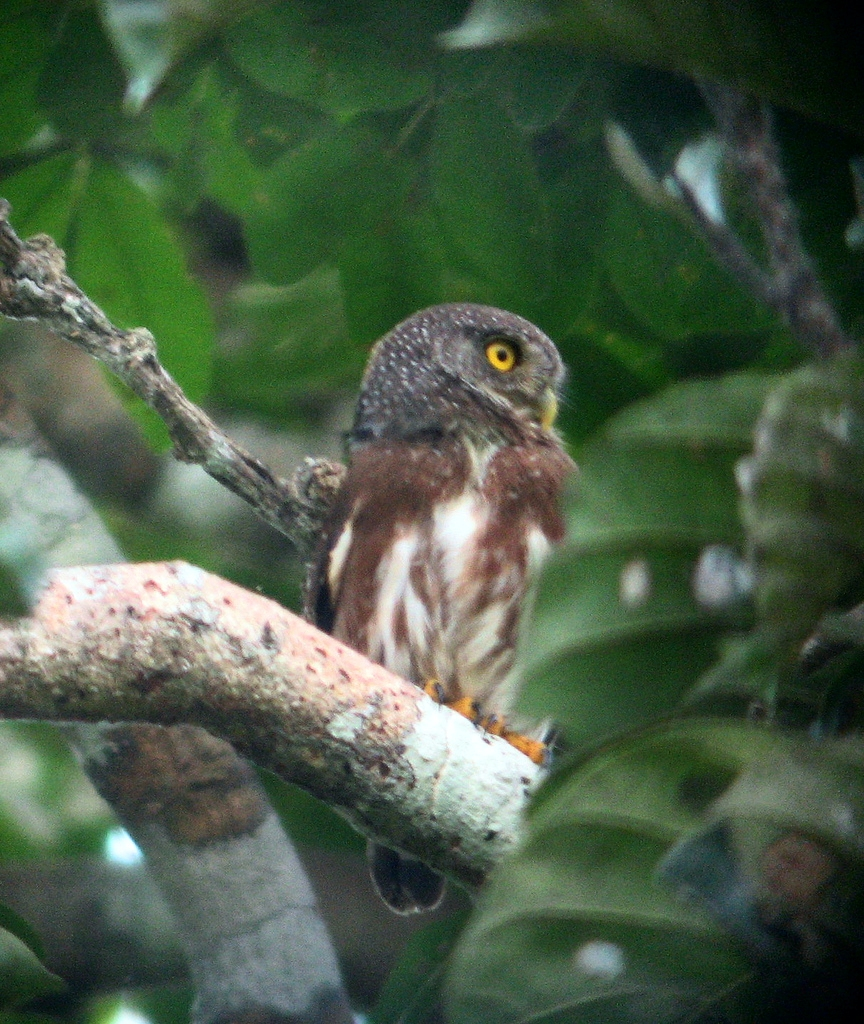
- Peru

Conservation status
- Least Concern (IUCN 3.1)
- CITES Appendix II

Scientific classification
- Kingdom: Animalia
- Phylum: Chordata
- Class: Aves
- Order: Strigiformes
- Family: Strigidae
- Genus: Glaucidium
- Species: G. hardyi

Binomial name
- Glaucidium hardyi Vielliard, 1989
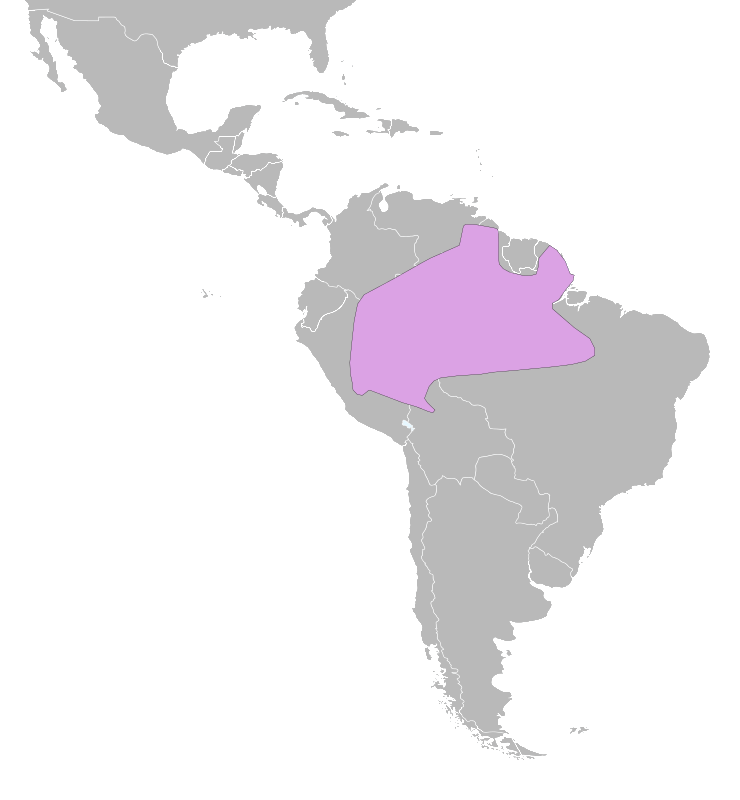
- Distribution of the Amazonian pygmy owl Resident

= Amazonian pygmy owl =

Species of owl

The Amazonian pygmy owl (Glaucidium hardyi), also known as Hardy's pygmy owl, is an owl found in northern South America and the Amazon Basin. A member of the Strigidae family, it is a true owl.

== Taxonomy ==
The Amazonian pygmy owl is a member of the Strigidae family, the true owls. It is in the genus Glaucidium, the pygmy owls, which are widely distributed across the Americas, Africa, and Eurasia. Until 1989, the Amazonian pygmy owl was not considered distinct from the least pygmy owl (Glaucidium minutissimum). New research suggested that the Amazonian pygmy owl was distinct, restricting the least pygmy owl to Atlantic forests of southeastern Brazil. The holotype for the species is located at the Department of Zoology at the Universidade Estadual de Campinas, Brazil. Phylogenetic studies on Glaucidium have been limited, but some analyses suggest that the Amazonian pygmy owl is closely related to the Andean pygmy owl (Glaucidium jardinii) and the Yungas pygmy owl (Glaucidium bolivianum).

== Description ==
=== Physical description ===
The Amazonian pygmy owl is very small, which is indicated by its name "glaucidium", meaning little owl. Adults have a large round head that is spotted with black marks, falsely looking like eyes. Their crown is a gray-brown color, spotted with very small white dots. Rectrices and remidges are both dark brown with three irregular bars of large white spots. They have white underparts with broad brown or rufous brown streaks. They measure 14–15 cm in length, adults typically weigh approximately 60 g. There is no observed sexual dimorphism in adults, meaning that males and females look identical. Juveniles appear similar to adults, but with an unspotted crown, and with less distinct streaking on underparts. They have bright golden yellow irises, a greenish yellow bill, and a pale yellow cere. They have talons in a zygodactyl arrangement.

=== Calls ===
The main call of the Amazonian pygmy owl consists of repeated, short, high-pitched tweets.

== Distribution and habitat ==
=== Distribution ===
The Amazonian pygmy owl occurs in the central and southwestern areas of the Amazonia region. Its presence has been confirmed in northern Bolivia, in Peru both in the Amazon and north of the Amazon, and extending east to eastern Venezuela, Guyana, Suriname, and French Guiana.

=== Habitat ===
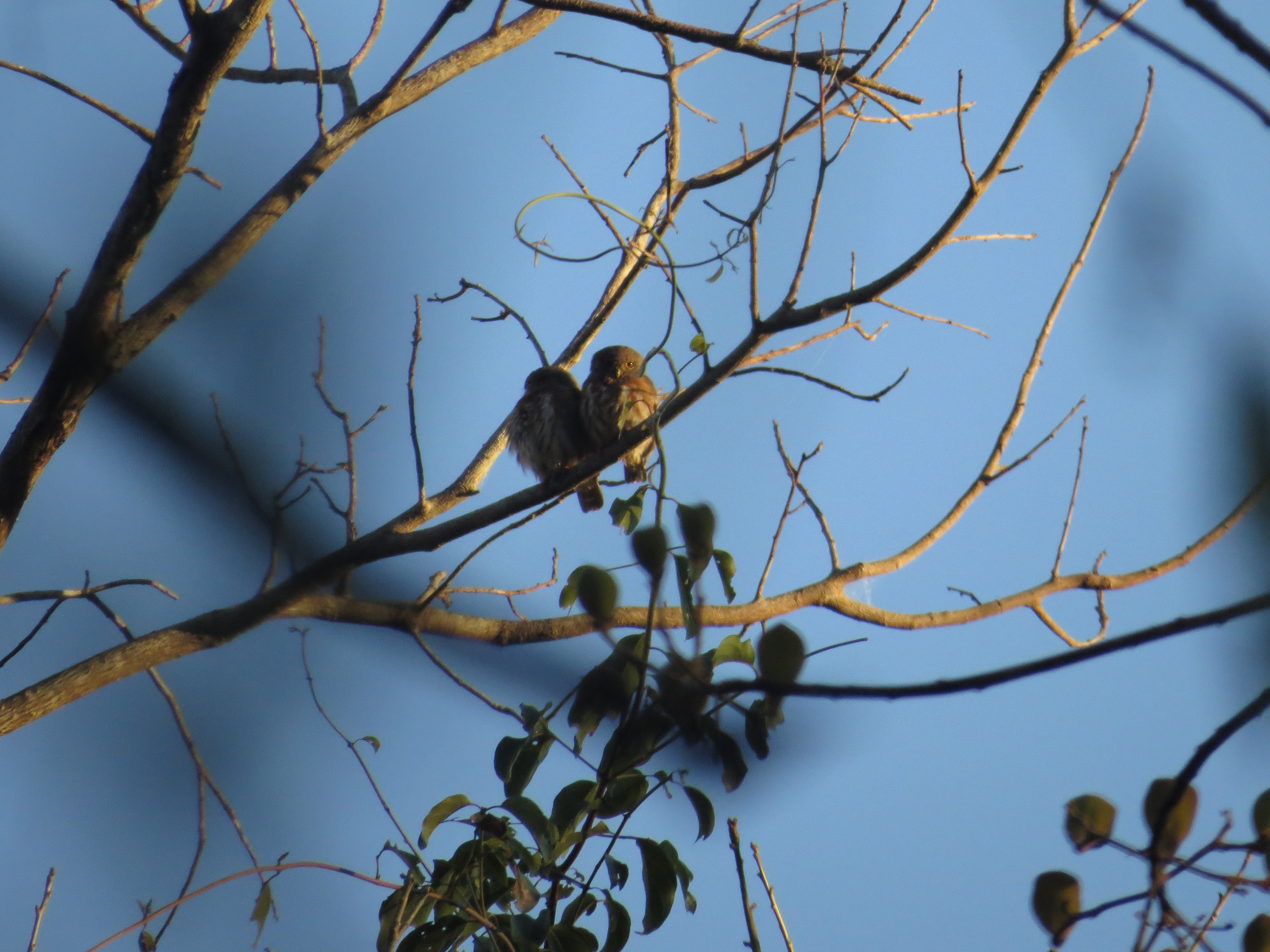
Two Amazonian pygmy owls perched in the canopy.

The habitat for the Amazonian pygmy owl is the canopy and subcanopy of tall, humid, tropical evergreen forests. They have been observed at elevations ranging from the lowlands to above 1100 meters.

== Behavior and ecology ==
=== Diet ===
Very little information exists on the diet of these birds. They presumably prey on large arthropods and small vertebrates.

=== Behavior ===
The species is diurnal, and individuals perch quietly in one place for long periods of time. As a result, sightings are rare even during the day. Existing observations suggest that they are socially monogamous.

=== Nesting ===
Only one nest has been documented in published literature, in French Guiana. The nest was situated in a used woodpecker hole, and two adults were present. One adult stayed near the nest at all times. Each adult only left for short periods of time to forage, under 15 minutes. This suggests a high level of parental care. A large cicada and a small unidentified bird were both brought back to the nest and fed to the young. The adults were seen panting with half-open beaks during the hottest hours of the day and frequently sang a soft, descending, high-pitched trill of notes.

=== Ecology ===
The Amazonian pygmy owl is one of the most common predators in the northern Amazon basin. It is frequently the subject of mobbing behavior by its prey as a defense mechanism.

== Conservation ==
The Amazonian pygmy owl is listed as Least Concern by the IUCN due to its large range. The IUCN also lists the population as decreasing. The population size has not been quantified. Research has shown canopy loss and fragmentation in the Amazon basin due to selective logging. As a canopy-dweller, the Amazonian pygmy owl is likely affected by these changes.
