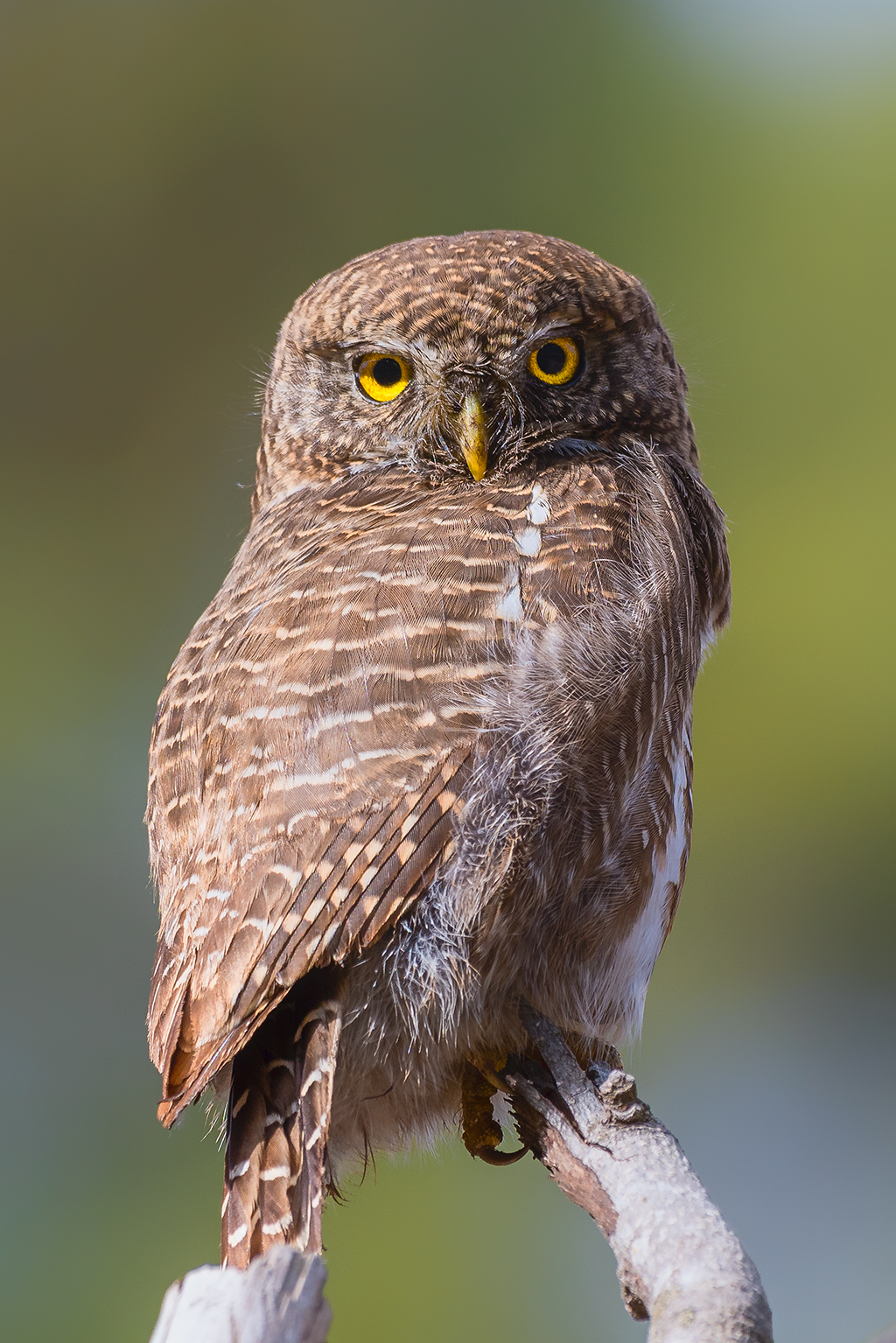
- Asian barred owlet – Sattal, Uttarakhand, India

Conservation status
- Least Concern (IUCN 3.1)
- CITES Appendix II

Scientific classification
- Kingdom: Animalia
- Phylum: Chordata
- Class: Aves
- Order: Strigiformes
- Family: Strigidae
- Genus: Glaucidium
- Species: G. cuculoides

Binomial name
- Glaucidium cuculoides (Vigors, 1830)
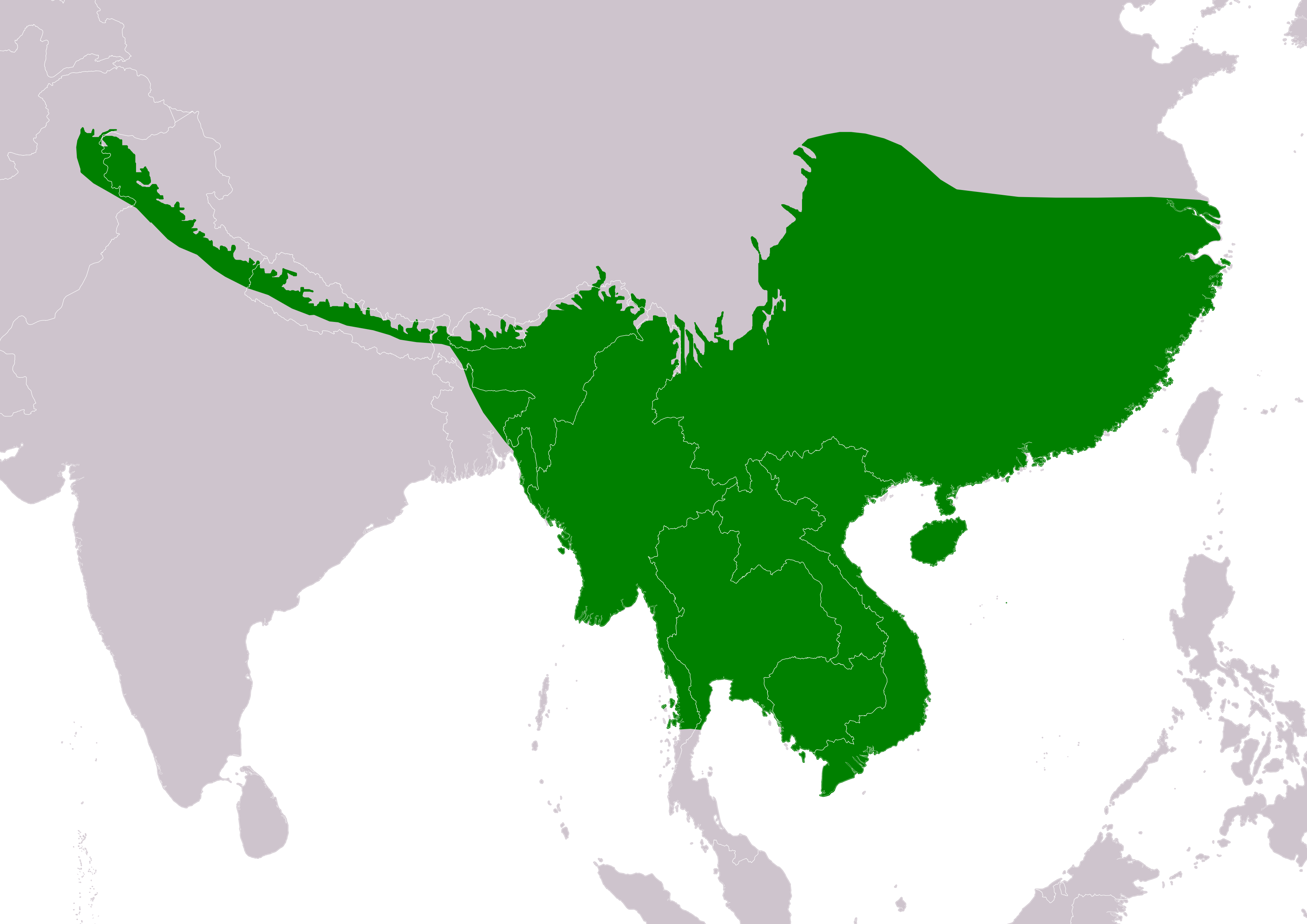
- Range of G. cuculoides Resident

= Asian barred owlet =

Species of owl

The Asian barred owlet (Glaucidium cuculoides), also known as the cuckoo owlet, is a species of pygmy owl native to the forests and shrublands of mainland Southeast Asia to the foothills of the Himalayas of northern Pakistan. It is a smaller owl, measuring 22–25 cm (8.7–9.8 in), making it one of the larger pygmy owls. They are primarily insectivorous but will eat lizards, small rodents and birds as well.

== Description ==
The Asian barred owlet is a small owl that sits at 22–25 cm (8.7–9.8 in). The males weigh 150–176 g (0.331–0.388 lb) and the females up to 240 g (0.53 lb). Like most owls in the true owl family, the females are usually larger than the males. They are dark brown or olive-brown with a white throat patch and are densely barred. Their breast and belly is whitish in colour with dark brown bars. Its tail and wings are dark brown with whitish bars. Unlike other pygmy owl species, they do not have false eyes on the back of their head. The juveniles have a streaked breast, not barred, and their head is a more ruddy brown colour. They are similar in appearance to the Javan owlet and collared owlet. The Asian barred owlet is mainly diurnal and will perch on bare branches to hunt freely throughout the day. Being more active during the day, they can often be mobbed by smaller birds and will sit still during the mobbing. Similar to other owlets, they have an undulating flight pattern, a series of rapid flaps then a pause with closed wings.

== Taxonomy ==
The Asian barred owl (Glaucidium cuculoides) is part of the Strigidae family, also known as the true owls. Within the family, there are 28 genera with 194 species. The genus Glaucidium includes the pygmy owls and is closely related to the genus Athene. The genus Glaucidium includes 26 species, such as the Asian barred owlet. The species was first described in 1831 and named Noctua cuculoides before being reclassified to the genus Glaucidium. On occasion, the name Taenioglaux cuculoides has been used synonymously to Glaucidium cuculoides when referring to the Asian barred owlet. There are currently eight recognized subspecies of the Asian barred owlet:

- G. c. cuculoides (Vigors, 1830) – west, central Himalayas
- G. c. austerum Ripley, 1948 – northeast India, Bhutan and northwest Myanmar
- G. c. rufescens Baker, ECS, 1926 – northeast India, Bangladesh, north Myanmar and south Yunnan (south China)
- G. c. whiteleyi (Blyth, 1867) – south China to northeast Vietnam
- G. c. persimile Hartert, EJO, 1910 – Hainan (off south China)
- G. c. delacouri Ripley, 1948 – northeast Laos and northwest, central Vietnam
- G. c. deignani Ripley, 1948 – southeast Thailand, south Vietnam and Cambodia
- G. c. bruegeli (Parrot, 1908) – southeast Myanmar and Thailand (except southeast)

== Habitat and distribution ==
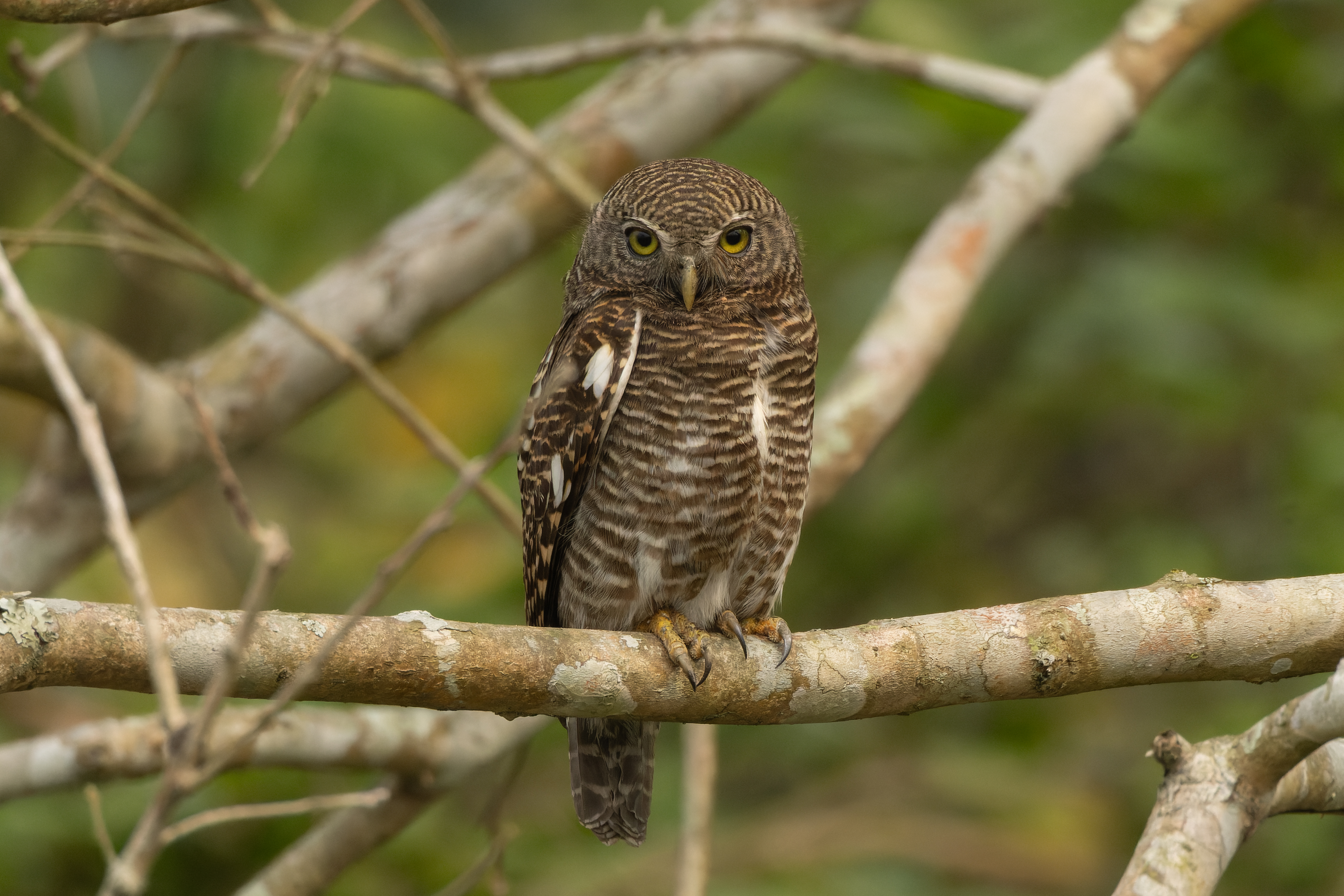
In Kaziranga National Park, Assam, India.

Asian barred owlets are commonly found in woodland habitats such as forests of pine and oak, subtropical and tropical evergreen jungles at lower elevations. They can also be found in foothills to submontane regions 2,100 m (6,900 ft) in elevation. The highest recorded sighting was at 2,700 m (8,900 ft) in the Himalayas of north Pakistan. They also sometimes live around developed areas in gardens and parks. Asian barred owlets have also displayed a preference for secondary forests over primary forests in parts of their range.

Asian barred owlets are widespread in the mainland of southeast Asia. They can be found in southeast China, Bhutan, Myanmar, Laos, Vietnam, Thailand, Nepal, Bangladesh, northeast India and the foothills of the Himalayas into Pakistan.

== Behaviour ==
=== Vocalizations ===
The male song is a trill lasting anywhere from 5–20 seconds, progressively becoming louder and harsher notes before stopping abruptly, transcribed as "kwuhk kwuhk-ke-kwuhk kwuhk-kekekwurre kwurre kwurre-kwurrekwurrekwurre kwurrekwurr". They also have a common call which is a smooth "hoot". Asian barred owlets are noisiest at dawn and a couple of hours after sunrise but will vocalize at any time of day.

=== Diet ===
Their diet mainly consists of insects, such as beetles, grasshoppers and cicadas. They will also eat lizards, small rodents, such as mice, and small birds. They hunt from a perch and will catch birds in the air. They have been observed catching common quail (Coturnix coturnix) in flight, snatching them from the air if they fly past.

=== Reproduction ===
The breeding season of Asian barred owlets is from January to February in Thailand and March to June in other parts of their range. They nest in unlined tree cavities and old nests of woodpeckers and barbets. They can also use the old nest cavity of collared scops owls (Otus lettia) where they share a habitat. They have even been known to kill woodpeckers or barbets for a nest hole. There have been a few ground nests observed in Thailand back in 2017, which were possibly a result of no suitable nest sites in the area. A breeding pair will lay a single clutch of 3 to 5 white and rounded eggs in a year. Once hatched, both parents take care of the young and bring food to the nest. The chicks will fledge as early as April in Thailand and early July for the majority of their range.

=== Movement ===
Asian barred owlets are resident birds and do not migrate long distances. They will move locally and tend to make local elevational movements by moving to lower elevations in the non-breeding season.

== Relationship with people ==
In parts of the Asian barred owlet's range, owls are seen as an evil bird and a sign of bad news to see or hear. This belief leads people to attempt to eradicate owls by shooting them, stealing eggs and using pesticides to kill them. These birds are already under threat from habitat destruction due to urbanization and deforestation so the consequences of this prejudice just increases their risk and discourages local conservation efforts.
