= Bird of the Year in Latvia =

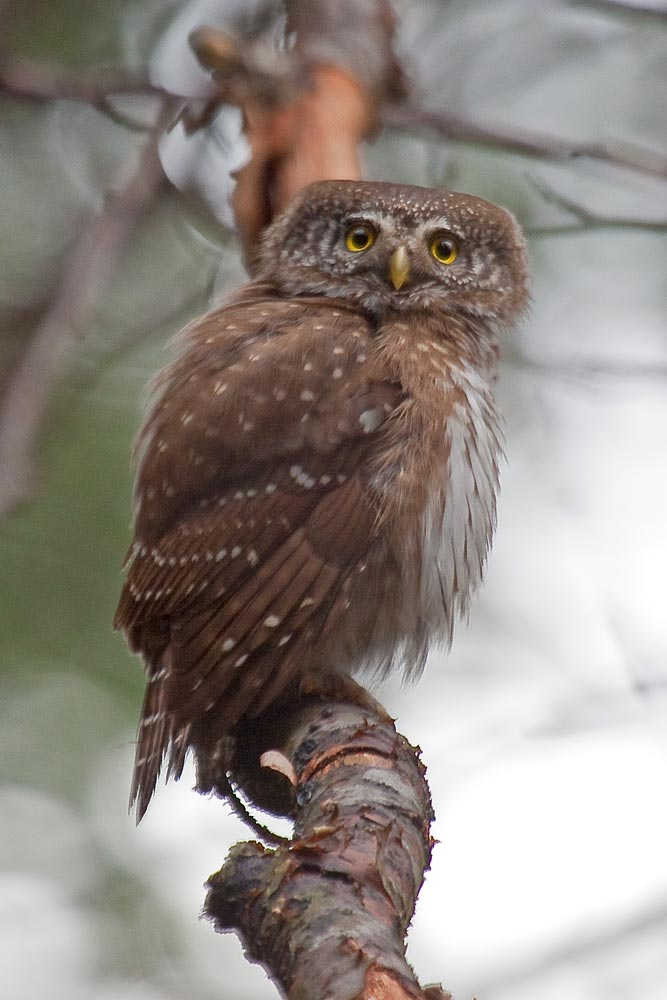
The 2026 bird of the year, the Eurasian Pygmy Owl

Bird of the Year in Latvia is an annual nomination of bird species of the Latvian fauna that is need of protection or attention. The designated bird species of the year is selected by the Latvian Ornithological Society [lv].

This category has been created to raise awareness about the species that are rare in the country or are endangered on a larger scale, or experience population decline, are in need of the protection of their habitats, or otherwise would benefit from additional attention from the general population.

The category has been present since 1996, and has been inspired from the first Bird of the Year nomination of 1971 in Germany.

== Selected bird species by the year ==
- 2026 – Pygmy owl (Glaucidium passerinum)
- 2025 – Common starling (Sturnus vulgaris)
- 2024 – Little tern (Sternula albifrons)
- 2023 – Thrush nightingale (Luscinia luscinia)
- 2022 – Common swift (Apus apus)
- 2021 – Gray partridge (Perdix perdix)
- 2020 – Common kingfisher (Alcedo atthis)
- 2019 – Hazel grouse (Tetrastes bonasia)
- 2018 – Common redshank (Tringa totanus)
- 2017 – Western yellow wagtail (Motacilla flava)
- 2016 – Great spotted woodpecker (Dendrocopos major)
- 2015 – European golden plover (Pluvialis apricaria)
- 2014 – Eurasian hoopoe (Upupa epops)
- 2013 – Long-tailed duck (Clangula hyemalis)
- 2012 – White-tailed eagle (Haliaeetus albicilla)
- 2011 – Tawny owl (Strix aluco)
- 2010 – Western capercaillie (Tetrao urogallus)
- 2009 – Great cormorant (Phalacrocorax carbo)
- 2008 – Black stork (Ciconia nigra)
- 2007 – Black woodpecker (Dryocopus martius)
- 2006 – Common kestrel (Falco tinnunculus)
- 2005 – Whooper swan (Cygnus cygnus)
- 2004 – White stork (Ciconia ciconia)
- 2003 – Black grouse (Lyrurus tetrix)
- 2002 – Black-headed gull (Chroicocephalus ridibundus)
- 2001 – Eurasian eagle-owl (Bubo bubo)
- 2000 – Northern lapwing (Vanellus vanellus)
- 1999 – Lesser spotted eagle (Clanga pomarina)
- 1998 – European roller (Coracias garrulus)
- 1997 – European nightjar (Caprimulgus europaeus)
- 1996 – Corn crake (Crex crex)
