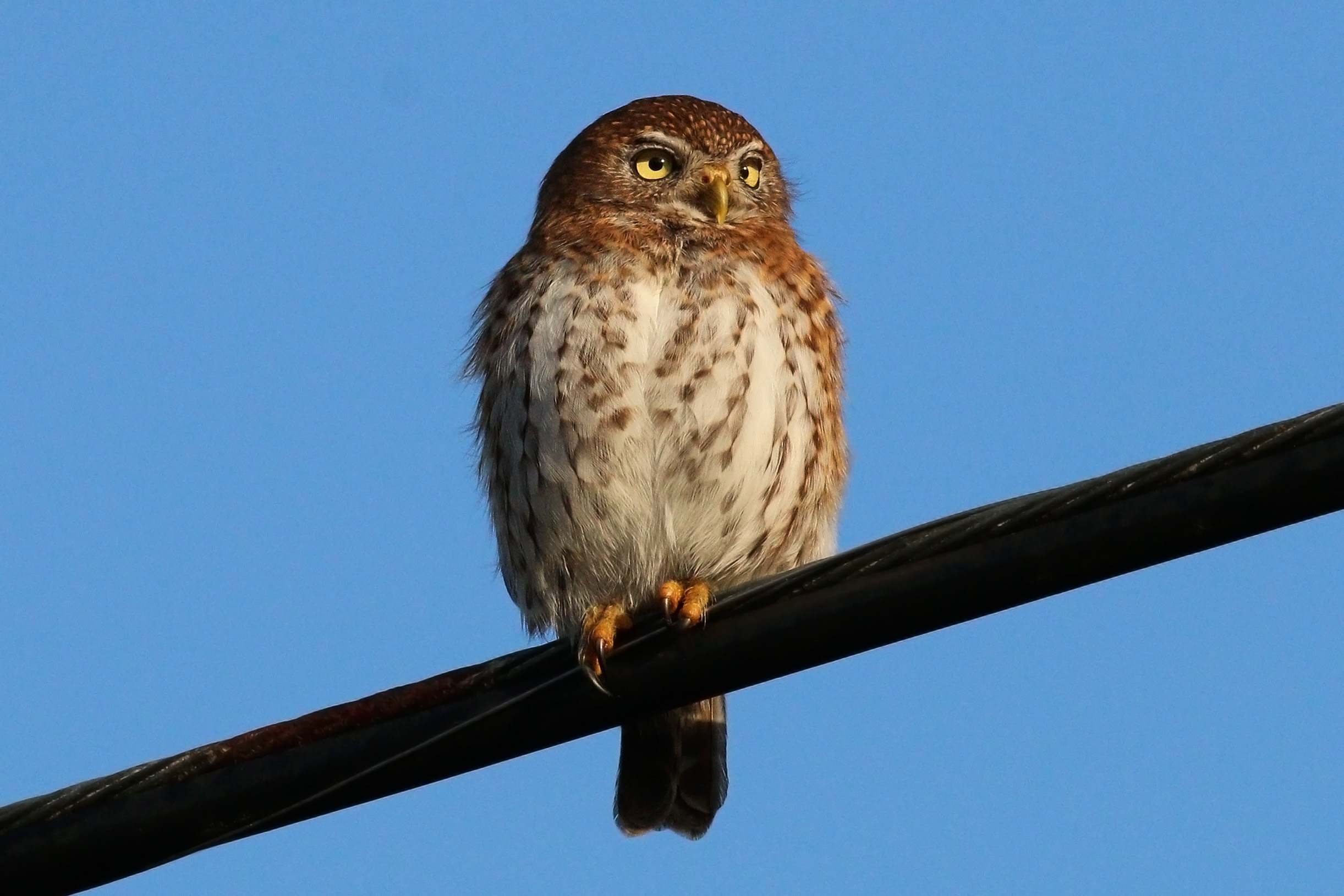
- G. s. siju, Zapata National Park, Cuba

Conservation status
- Least Concern (IUCN 3.1)
- CITES Appendix II

Scientific classification
- Kingdom: Animalia
- Phylum: Chordata
- Class: Aves
- Order: Strigiformes
- Family: Strigidae
- Genus: Glaucidium
- Species: G. siju

Binomial name
- Glaucidium siju (D'Orbigny, 1839)
- Distribution of Cuban pygmy owl Resident

= Cuban pygmy owl =

Species of owl

The Cuban pygmy owl (Glaucidium siju) is a species of owl in the family Strigidae that is endemic to Cuba.

== Taxonomy and systematics ==
The Cuban pygmy owl has three subspecies, the nominate Glaucidium siju siju, G. s. turquinense, and G. s. vittatum.

== Description ==
The Cuban pygmy owl is 16 to 17 cm (6.3 to 6.7 in) long. Males weigh 47 to 68 g (1.7 to 2.4 oz) and females 66 to 102 g (2.3 to 3.6 oz). It has two color morphs, gray-brown and rufous; the former is more common. Both morphs have a pale grayish face, whitish to cinnamon "brows" over yellow eyes, and a pair of dark "false eyes" on the nape. The nominate gray-brown morph's crown, sides of the head, and back are grayish brown with white spots; the shoulders have diffuse dark barring. The tail is also grayish brown, with white bars. The throat is brown, the sides of the breast and flanks brown with darker bars, the center of the breast white, and the rest of the underparts off-white with dark brown streaks and spots. The rufous morph replaces the gray-brown with cinnamon. G. s. turquinense is much darker and has fewer spots on the upperparts. G. s. vittatum is larger than the nominate and the barring on the shoulders is more defined.

== Distribution and habitat ==
The Cuban pygmy owl is the most common and most frequently observed owl in the country. The nominate subspecies is found throughout the main island of Cuba except on its highest mountain, Pico Turquino. Subspecies G. s. turquinense is found only on that mountain and G. s. vittatum on the Isla de la Juventud (Isle of Pines) and possibly the Guanahacabibes Peninsula. The species inhabits the interiors and edges of coastal, deciduous, and montane forest, both primary and secondary. It is also found in areas such as pastures with scattered trees, cultivated fields, plantations, and large city parks. In elevation it ranges from sea level to 1,500 m (4,900 ft).

== Behavior ==
=== Feeding ===
The Cuban pygmy owl is active in both daytime and the night. It hunts from a perch; though its diet has not been studied in detail, it appears to feed mostly on insects and small reptiles, and also takes small mammals, birds, and frogs.

=== Breeding ===
The Cuban pygmy owl nests in the dry season of November to April. It lays a clutch of three or four eggs in a tree cavity, either natural or one previously used by a woodpecker. The female incubates the eggs.

=== Vocalization ===
The Cuban pygmy owl has two known vocalizations. The male sings "a series of more or less equally spaced notes similar to the song of the mountain pygmy owl (Glaucidium gnoma)". Both sexes make an apparent alarm call, "a rapid and accelerating series of rather higher-pitched, squeaky-sounding notes".

== Status ==
The IUCN has assessed the Cuban pygmy owl as being of Least Concern. Though its population has not been quantified, it is considered fairly common to common. It is "[a]dversely affected by destruction of small patches of woodland".
