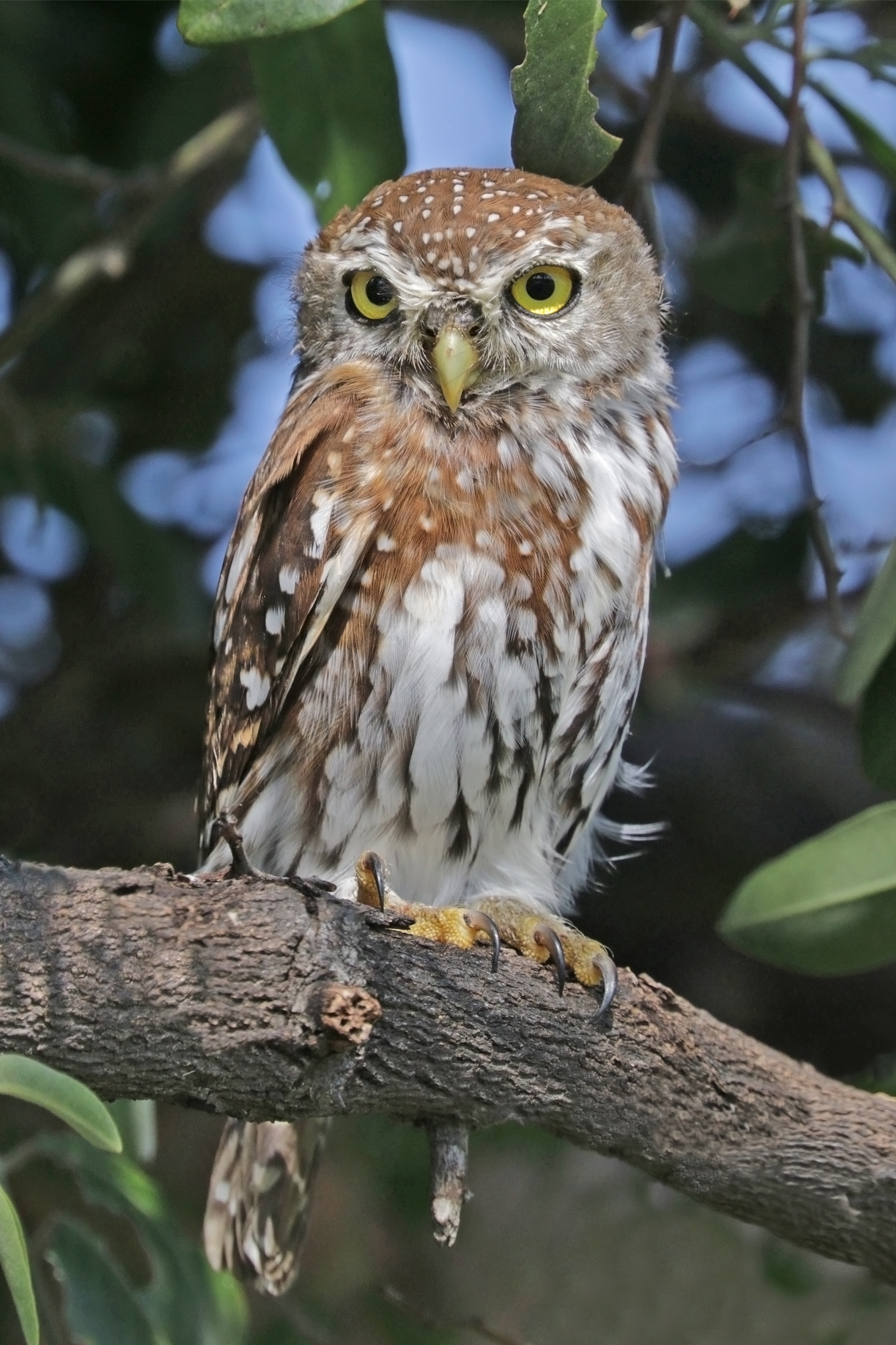
- G. p. diurnum in Chobe NP, Botswana

Conservation status
- Least Concern (IUCN 3.1)
- CITES Appendix II

Scientific classification
- Kingdom: Animalia
- Phylum: Chordata
- Class: Aves
- Order: Strigiformes
- Family: Strigidae
- Genus: Glaucidium
- Species: G. perlatum

Binomial name
- Glaucidium perlatum (Vieillot, 1817)

Audio
- Calls of G. p. licua in South Africa

= Pearl-spotted owlet =

Species of owl

The pearl-spotted owlet (Glaucidium perlatum) is a small bird of prey found in sub-Saharan Africa. They belong to the Strigidae family, otherwise known as the typical owls or the true owls, which contains most species of owl. As part of the genus Glaucidium, or pygmy owls, they are commonly referred to as 'owlets' due to their diminutive size. Pearl-spotted owlets are brownish and heavily spotted white, with two distinct black false 'eyes' at the back of their head. They are often confused with an African barred owlet.

== Description ==
The pearl-spotted owlet is one of the smallest owls in Africa with a length of 17 to 21 cm. The females are slightly larger and heavier (100g) than the males (65g). Both males and females have similar plumage colouration. The facial disc is off-white and the eyes are yellow. At the back of the head there are two striking false black 'eyes' with a white outline. The upper parts are cinnamon-brown with white spots. The tail and flight feathers are brown, with large white spots forming bars in flight. The bill and cere are pale greenish yellow, the legs are feathered white and feet are yellow. Juveniles are similar to adults but the head and back spots may be lacking or much reduced and the false 'face' is very obvious.

Pearl-spotted owlets are often confused with African barred owlets, which have finely barred (not spotted) head and back, a blotched (not streaked) breast, barring across the upper breast, lack the false 'eyes', and have a proportionally large head.

=== Vocalisation ===
Pearl-spotted owlets call by day and night, especially before breeding, but are quiet when nesting. They have a distinct call: a loud series of shrill, short whistles that accelerate in tempo and rise in volume to a crescendo of long, loud whistles that descend in pitch and volume, peu peu peu-peu-peu peeuu peeeuu. A breeding pair may call in duet, whereby the female is higher pitched. In alarm, pair members give soft whistles and peeps.

== Distribution and subspecies ==
The pearl-spotted owlet occurs in sub-Saharan Africa, particularly widespread across savanna, in southern Africa, across north and central Namibia, south to southern limit of arid bushveld and woodland in south Namibia. Their occurrence continues further north through Botswana and Zimbabwe up to Sudan and west to Senegal.

They occur in a wide range of woodland and bushveld habitats, especially mopane and open thorn savanna with areas of sparse ground cover. They avoid dense woodland and forest, and open grassland and shrubland.

Currently, there are three recognised subspecies throughout Africa:

- Glaucidium perlatum perlatum — Senegal and Gambia to western Sudan
- Glaucidium perlatum licua (Lichtenstein, 1842) — Eastern Sudan and Ethiopia to northern South Africa, Angola and Namibia
- Glaucidium perlatum diurnum (Clancey, 1968) — Namibia, Botswana, Zimbabwe, and Mozambique

The pearl-spotted owlet has an extremely large range, and hence does not approach the thresholds for Vulnerable under the range size criterion of the IUCN. The population trend appears to be stable, and although the population size has not been quantified, it is not believed to be of concern. For these reasons the pearl-spotted owlet is evaluated as Least Concern on the IUCN Red List.

== Behaviour ==
The pearl-spotted owlet is often active by day, but hunts and calls mostly at night. They roost in relatively open sites below canopies of small bushes or shrubs, staring intently at intruders and readily changing perches if disturbed. When alarmed they will often flick or wag their tail feathers. They are seen bathing regularly by day when open water is available. Their flight is fast and undulating with whirring wings.

=== Foraging and food ===
They hunt mostly at night from a low perch, taking prey from the ground below, but sometimes swooping to snatch it from foliage, off nests or in flight. They hunt opportunistically by day, often being mobbed by small birds. They flick their tail feathers when excited while hunting, or bob the head up and down. Pearl-spotted owlets predominantly eat arthropods — especially grasshoppers, crickets, and solifuges — but are capable of hunting small vertebrates such as rodents, bats, lizards, snakes and small birds.

Although the pearl-spotted owlet is not a threat to larger vertebrates, the capture and killing of pearl-spotted owlets by Red colobus in western Uganda as an anti-predator behaviour has been observed.

=== Breeding ===
Pearl-spotted owlets are monogamous, solitary nesters, and highly territorial. The density of nesting in lightly wooded habitat is limited by nest-hole availability. The male takes food to the female as a courtship display and the female spends long periods calling softly from within the nest before laying. Their nests are usually old holes excavated by large barbets or woodpeckers. A single female has been observed to use the same nest site for at least 4 years. Females usually have from 2 to 4 eggs with an incubation period around 29 days.
