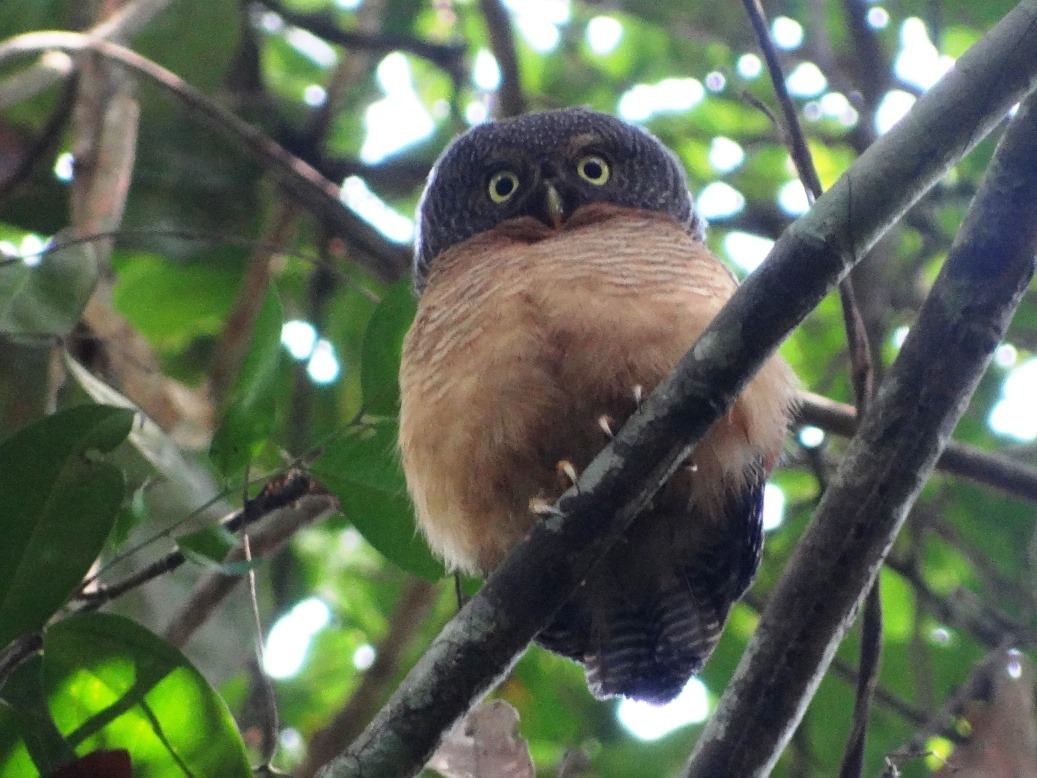

Conservation status
- Least Concern (IUCN 3.1)
- CITES Appendix II

Scientific classification
- Kingdom: Animalia
- Phylum: Chordata
- Class: Aves
- Order: Strigiformes
- Family: Strigidae
- Genus: Glaucidium
- Species: G. sjostedti

Binomial name
- Glaucidium sjostedti Reichenow, 1893

= Sjöstedt's barred owlet =

Species of owl

Sjöstedt's barred owlet (Glaucidium sjostedti), also known as Sjöstedt's owlet, is a species of owl in the family Strigidae from west central Africa.

== Description ==
Sjöstedt's barred owlet is a small owl, which has a brown head, neck and upper back densely marked with thin, white bars, while the remainder of the upperparts are deep reddish brown. There is extensive barring on the breast, where many dark brown bars are set against the light cinnamon-brown background; the barring becomes more diffuse towards the lower belly and vent. It has a distinctive face, with bold, white eyebrows above bright yellow eyes. Juveniles resemble the adults, but are generally paler, with a yellow-brown cast to the underparts and faint barring on the upper breast, darkening to become chestnut around the throat.

=== Voice ===
Sjöstedt's barred owlet has a distinctive call which can be rendered as "kroo-kroo-kroo", which is most often made around dawn and dusk.

== Distribution and habitat ==
Sjöstedt's barred owlet occurs in western Central Africa, from south-eastern Nigeria east through Cameroon to the Central African Republic, and southwards to Equatorial Guinea, Gabon, northern Congo and north-western and central Democratic Republic of Congo.

Sjöstedt's barred owlet is generally restricted to lowland primary forest; it avoids regions that are particularly damp, and the forest edges. It occurs at high altitude on Mount Cameroon.

== Behaviour ==
Sjöstedt's barred owlet is a nocturnal species, hunting during the night in the forest understorey. Its diet consists of insects such as grasshoppers, but also spiders, crabs, mice, small snakes and nestling birds. When an owlet is disturbed from its daytime roost, it often results in mobbing behaviour by small birds, e.g. passerines. The breeding season of Sjöstedt's barred owlet is little known, although it lays in July in Gabon and young have been found in nests throughout much of the year in Cameroon. The males are territorial, calling loudly in order to attract females and to warn off potentially rival males. The nest is in a cavity or natural tree hollow, where the female lays a clutch of at least two eggs, with an incubation period of around one month.

== Etymology ==
The species is named after Swedish naturalist Bror Yngve Sjöstedt.
