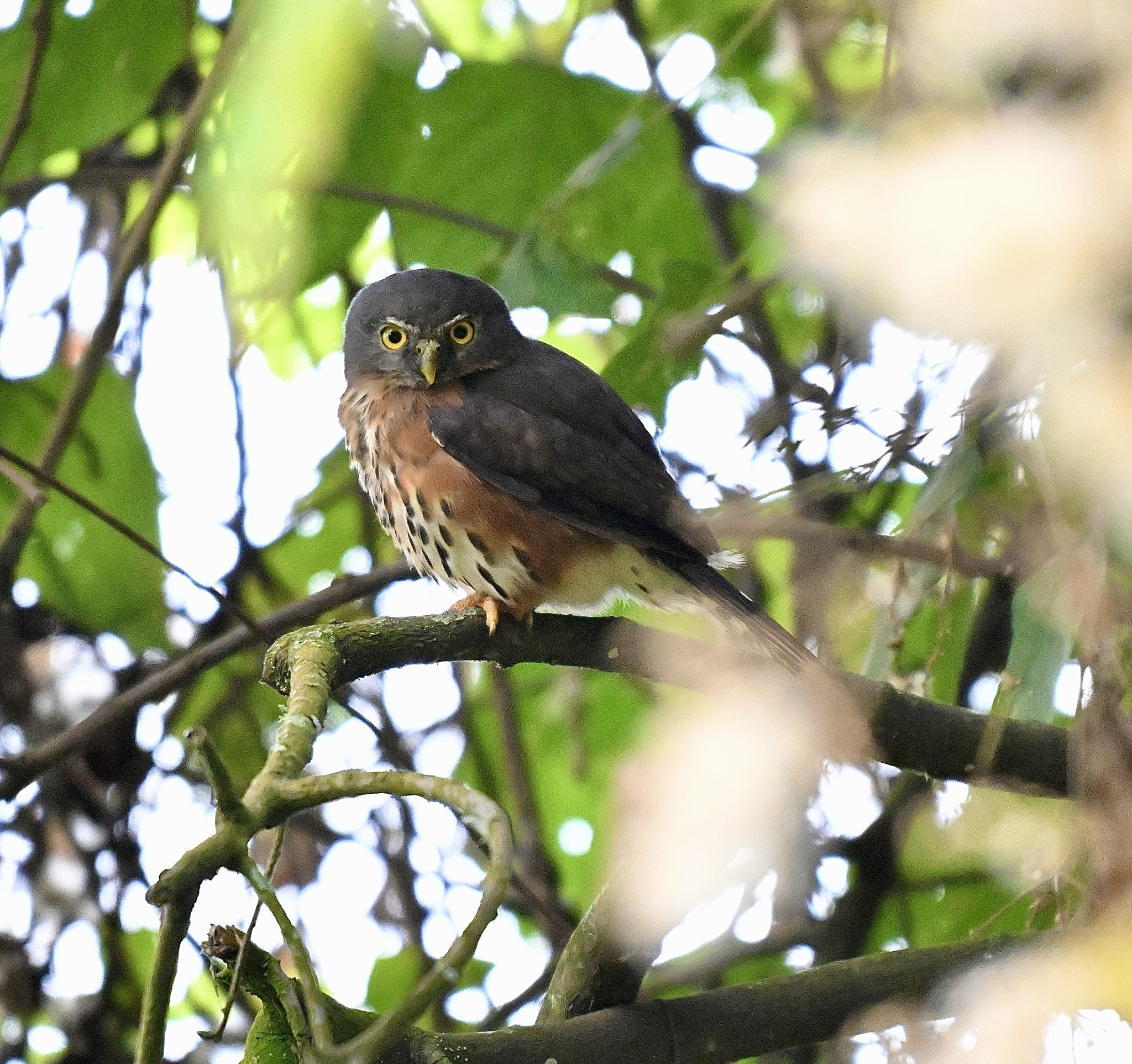

Conservation status
- Least Concern (IUCN 3.1)
- CITES Appendix II

Scientific classification
- Kingdom: Animalia
- Phylum: Chordata
- Class: Aves
- Order: Strigiformes
- Family: Strigidae
- Genus: Glaucidium
- Species: G. tephronotum

Binomial name
- Glaucidium tephronotum Sharpe, 1875

= Red-chested owlet =

Species of owl

The red-chested owlet (Glaucidium tephronotum) is a species of owl in the family Strigidae, native to the African tropical rainforest. Its habits and behaviour are poorly known.

== Description ==
The red-chested owlet is a very small owl, which has a light grey facial disc with whitish markings and short white eyebrows. The head and neck are dark grey and the back and wings are sooty brown. The long tail has three faint bars, the upper breast and flanks have a reddish-brown wash, while the remainder of the underparts are whitish with rufous streaks on the side of the belly. The iris and bill are yellow. Length is about 14 cm (5.5 in) and wingspan is about 35 cm (14 in).

=== Voice ===
The call of the red-chested owlet is a series of up to 20 high-pitched whistling notes.

== Distribution, subspecies and habitat ==
There are currently three recognised subspecies of red-chested owlet:

- G. t. tephronotum: Liberia, Ivory Coast and Ghana
- G. t. pycrafti: southern Cameroon and northern Gabon
- G. t. medje: Congo, eastern Democratic Republic of the Congo, southwestern Uganda and western Kenya

The red-chested owlet inhabits primary rain forest and a mosaic of forest and scrub, as well as clearings and forest edges. It inhabits elevations of up to 2,150 m (7,050 ft) above sea level.

== Behaviour ==
The red-chested owlet is mainly nocturnal but will hunt and call on overcast afternoons; it roosts in cavities in trees during the day. The main food is insects such as beetles, mantises, grasshoppers, moths and cockroaches, as well as small mammals and birds. Its breeding behaviour is almost unknown but it is thought to nest in the old nesting cavities created by woodpeckers or barbets.

== Conservation status ==
The IUCN (International Union for Conservation of Nature) Red List, classifies the red-chested owlet as least concern, since the population is believed to be stable and has a sizable range.
