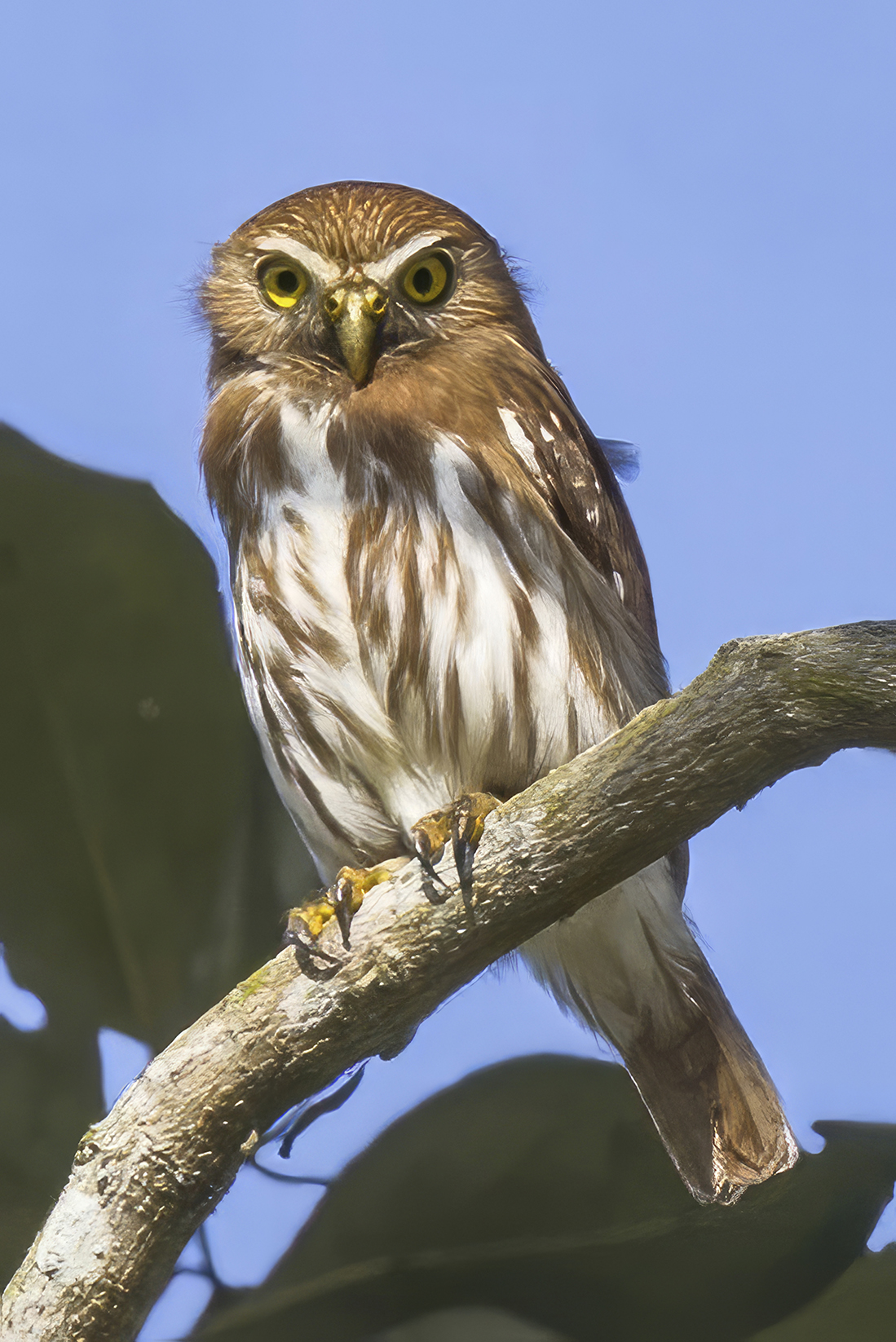
- G. b. ridgwayi in Honduras

Conservation status
- Least Concern (IUCN 3.1)
- CITES Appendix II

Scientific classification
- Kingdom: Animalia
- Phylum: Chordata
- Class: Aves
- Order: Strigiformes
- Family: Strigidae
- Genus: Glaucidium
- Species: G. brasilianum

Binomial name
- Glaucidium brasilianum (Gmelin, JF, 1788)
- Distribution of ferruginous pygmy owl Resident

= Ferruginous pygmy owl =

Species of owl

The ferruginous pygmy owl (Glaucidium brasilianum) is a species of small owl found in the southwestern United States, extending south through Mexico, Central America, and into South America, including countries like Brazil, Bolivia, Paraguay and Argentina.

It is the most widely distributed species of pygmy owl in Central and South America and is believed to be one of the most common owls in these regions, where it lives in a variety of semi-open wooded habitats.

== Taxonomy ==
The ferruginous pygmy owl was formally described in 1788 by the German naturalist Johann Friedrich Gmelin in his revised and expanded edition of Carl Linnaeus's Systema Naturae. The species was originally assigned the binomial name Strix brasiliana, grouping it with other owls under the genus Strix. Although Gmelin did not directly cite it, his original description ultimately derived from the "Caburé", a small owl documented in 1648 by German naturalist Georg Marcgrave in his work Historia Naturalis Brasiliae. The ferruginous pygmy owl is currently classified alongside 28 other small owls in the genus Glaucidium, introduced in 1826 by German zoologist Friedrich Boie. The genus name derives from the Ancient Greek glaukidion, meaning "little owl" or "owlet", a diminutive of glaux, the Greek word for "owl".

Thirteen subspecies are recognized:

- G. b. cactorum Van Rossem, 1937 – south Arizona (USA) to Sonora to north Nayarit (west Mexico)
- G. b. intermedium Phillips, AR, 1966 – south Nayarit to Oaxaca (west Mexico)
- G. b. ridgwayi Sharpe, 1875 – south Texas (central south USA) to west Panama
- G. b. medianum Todd, 1916 – north Colombia
- G. b. margaritae Phelps, WH & Phelps, WH Jr, 1951 – Margarita Island (off Venezuela)
- G. b. phaloenoides (Daudin, 1800) – north, east Venezuela, Trinidad and the Guianas
- G. b. duidae Chapman, 1929 – Cerro Duida (south Venezuela)
- G. b. olivaceum Chapman, 1939 – Auyán Tepui (southeast Venezuela)
- G. b. ucayalae Chapman, 1929 – Amazonia
- G. b. brasilianum (Gmelin, JF, 1788) – east Brazil to northeast Argentina
- G. b. pallens Brodkorb, 1938 – east Bolivia, west Paraguay and north Argentina
- G. b. stranecki König, C & Wink, 1995 – central Argentina to south Uruguay
- G. b. tucumanum Chapman, 1922 – west Argentina

Trinidad, along with other regions, has endemic subspecies of the Glaucidium brasilianum owl. Recent genetics research has revealed significant differences in ferruginous pygmy owls from various regions and members of the northern ridgwayi group, sometimes considered a separate species, Ridgway's pygmy-owl (Glaucidium ridgwayi).

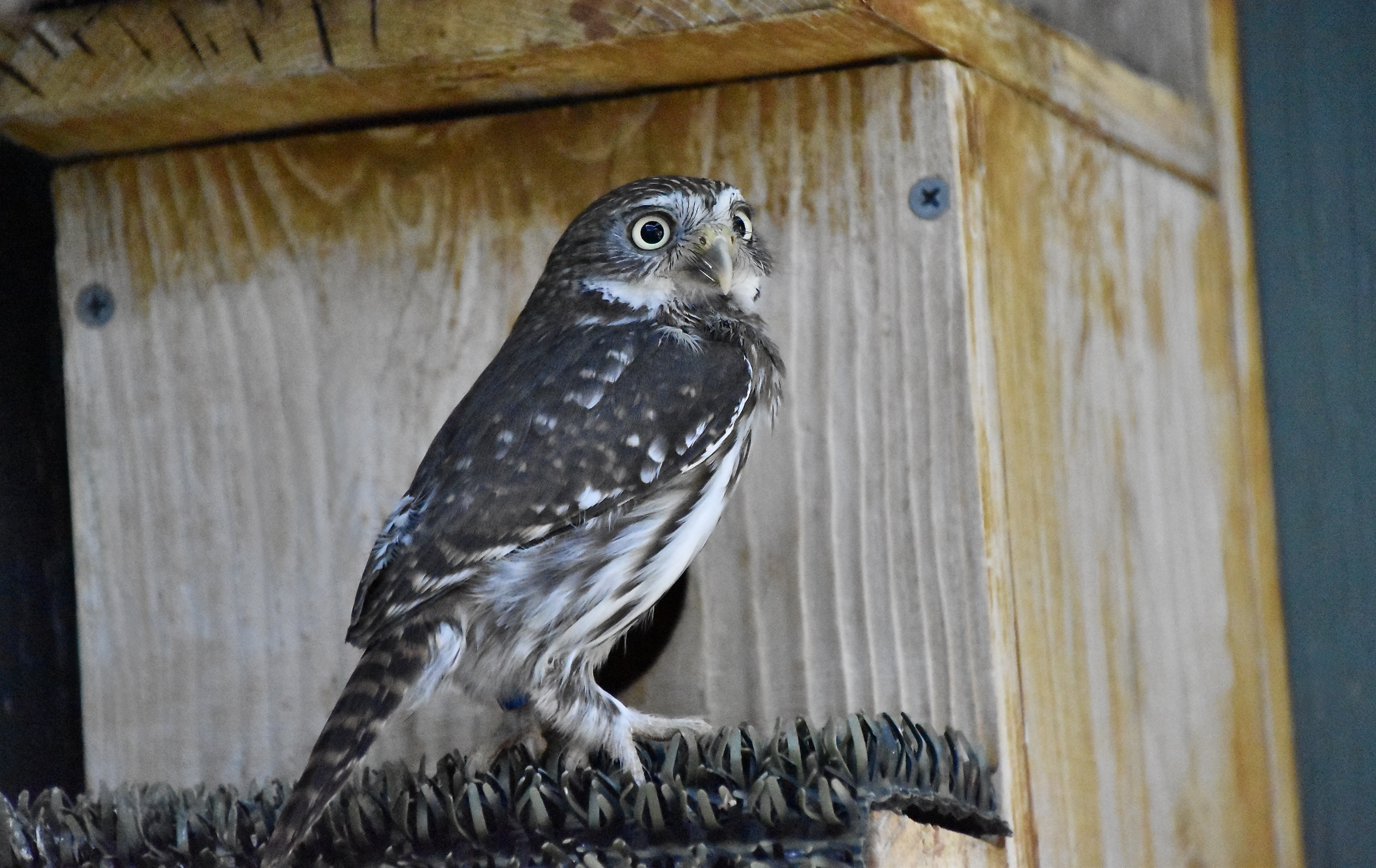
G. b. cactorum at Wild At Heart Raptors in Arizona.

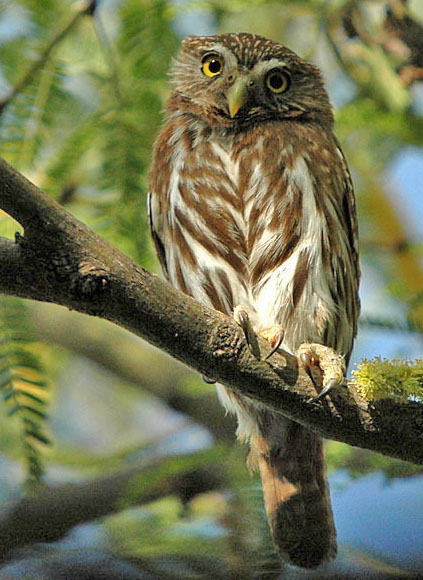
G. b. cactorum
northwest Mexico

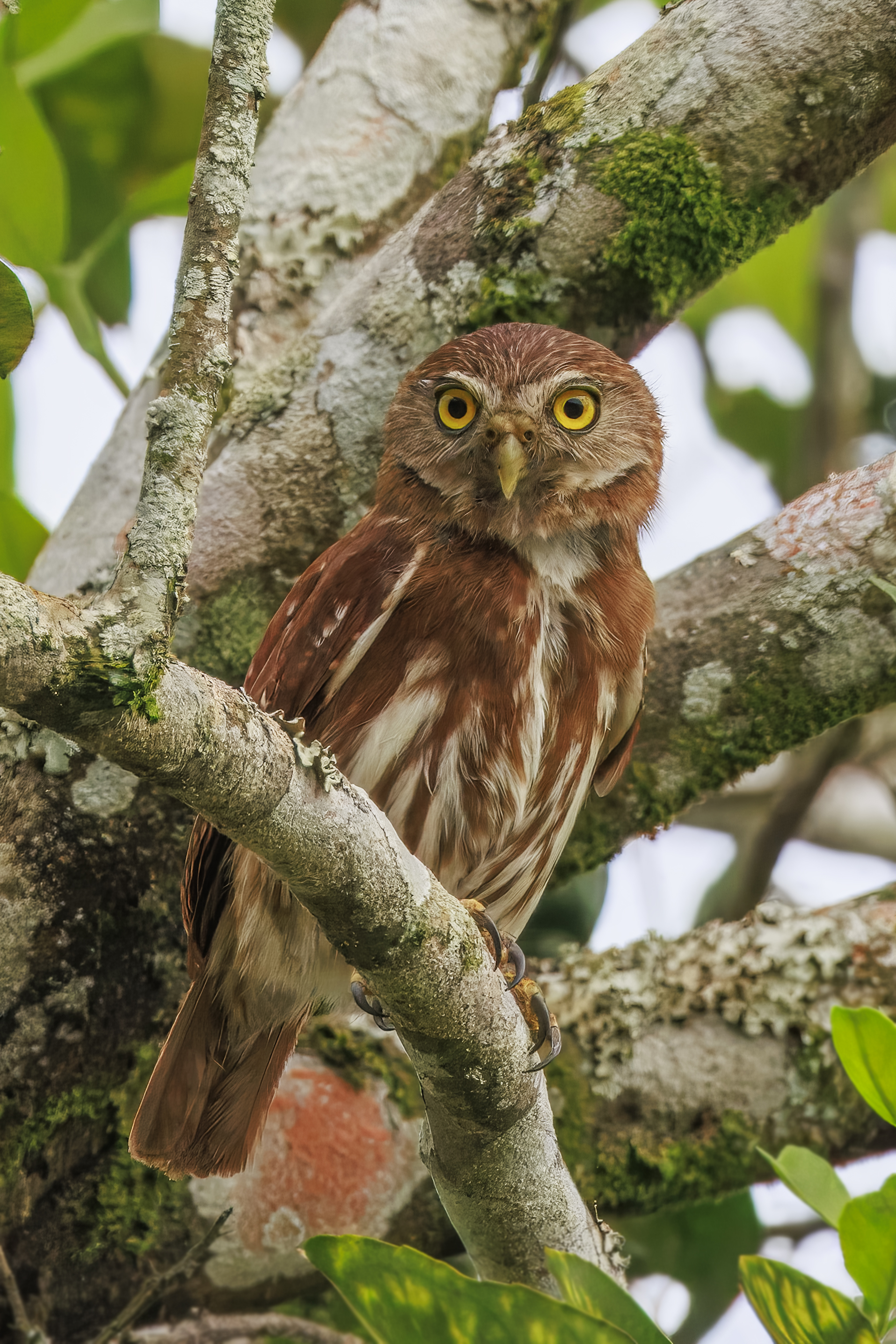
rufous morph
G. b. ucayalae
Ecuador

== Description ==
The ferruginous pygmy owl is small, typically 15 cm (5.9 in), and stocky with disproportionately large feet and talons. The crown has elongated white/buff streaks, the wing coverts have white spots, and the underparts are heavily streaked white. There are prominent white supercilia above the facial disc. There are two dark spots on the nape, often termed "false eyes" by birders. Otherwise, its overall color is highly variable, ranging from grey-brown with a black-and-white barred tail to rich rufous with a uniform rufous tail. Sexes are similar with females slightly larger and often more reddish. The flight is often undulating in motion, similar to that of many woodpecker species.

=== Call ===
The call is a rhythmic, whistled series of hoo-hoo-hoo-hoo, typically pitched in E flat. Its sound is easily mimicked by birdwatchers to draw out small songbirds intent on mobbing the owls.

== Behavior and ecology ==
The owl is often easily located by the activity of small songbirds that gather to mob it while it perches in the canopy. Observations have recorded up to 40 individual birds representing 11 species mobbing a single ferruginous pygmy owl.

=== Food and feeding ===
This species is primarily crepuscular, though it frequently hunts during daylight hours. Its diet consists of a wide range of invertebrates, reptiles, amphibians, birds and mammals. Documented prey includes insects such as grasshoppers, crickets, cicadas and scorpions. It also targets small reptiles like six-lined racerunners, four-lined skinks, Texas spotted whiptails, alongside birds including creamy-bellied thrushes, pale-breasted thrushes and eared doves.

=== Breeding ===
The breeding season occurs from late winter to early spring. As a cavity nesting species, it utilizes hollows in trees and columnar cacti to lay one to seven white eggs. Incubation lasts approximately 28 days, followed by a fledging period of 27 to 30 days.

== Status and conservation ==
The northernmost subspecies, G. b. cactorum, commonly called the cactus ferruginous pygmy owl, was a listed Endangered species under the U.S. Endangered Species Act. It This protected it in south-central Arizona from loss of habitat and buffel grass fires. Buffel grass catches fire very easily, which spreads to cacti, burning the owl's primary habitat. Its range extends over the border into Sonora, Mexico. G. b. cactorum was delisted in 2006. It was also considered to be an Imperiled Subspecies by NatureServe, with the species as a whole considered Secure.
