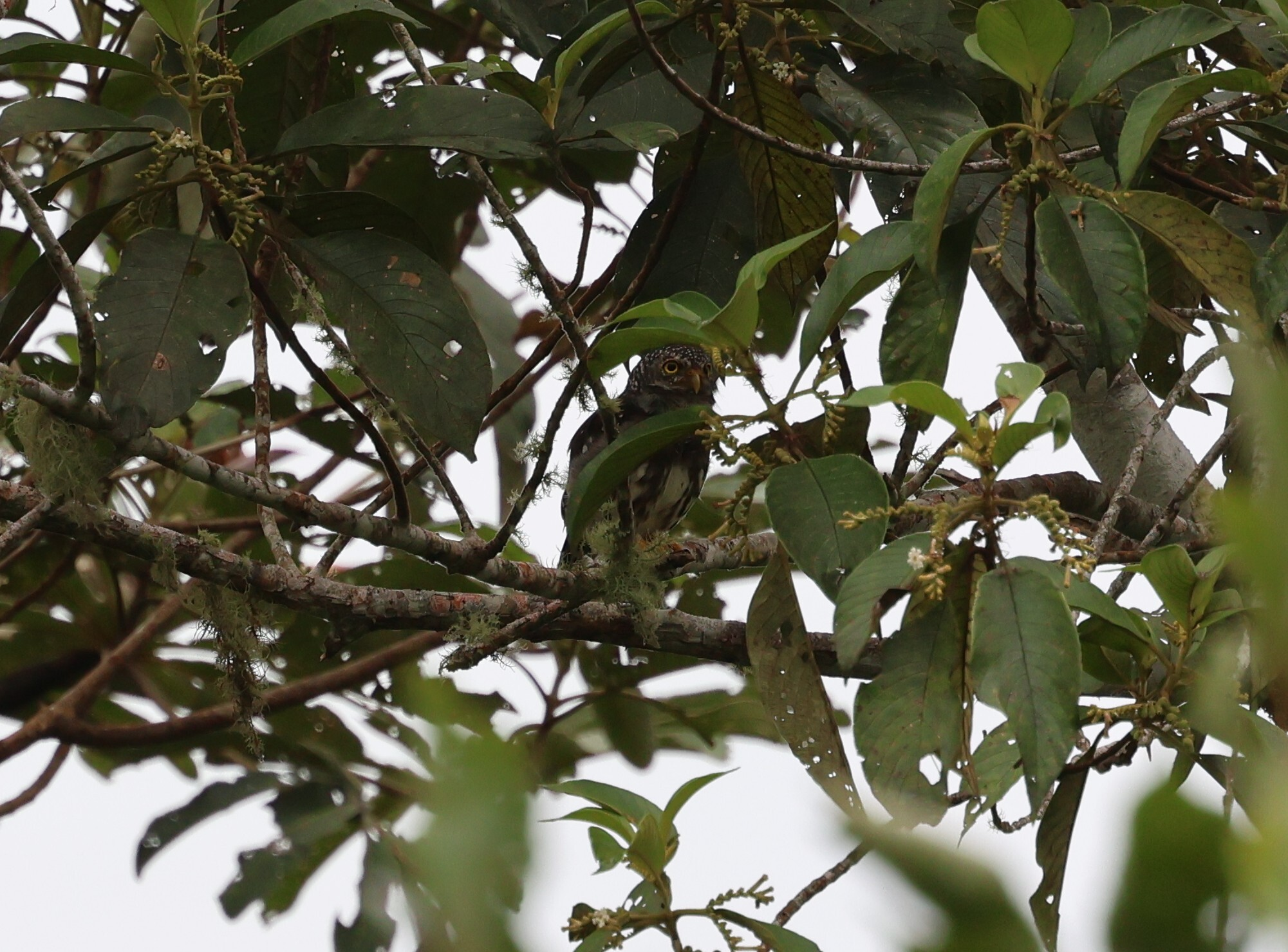

Conservation status
- Least Concern (IUCN 3.1)
- CITES Appendix II

Scientific classification
- Kingdom: Animalia
- Phylum: Chordata
- Class: Aves
- Order: Strigiformes
- Family: Strigidae
- Genus: Glaucidium
- Species: G. parkeri

Binomial name
- Glaucidium parkeri Robbins & Howell, 1995
- Distribution of subtropical pygmy owl Resident

= Subtropical pygmy owl =

Species of owl

The subtropical pygmy owl (Glaucidium parkeri) is a species of owl in the family Strigidae. It is found in Bolivia, Colombia, Ecuador, and Peru.

== Taxonomy and systematics ==
The subtropical pygmy owl's specific epithet honors Theodore A. (Ted) Parker III, "who for over twenty years accumulated an unparalleled knowledge of Neotropical birds and graciously shared his vast expertise with all". It is monotypic.

== Description ==
The subtropical pygmy owl is about 14 to 14.5 cm (5.5 to 5.7 in) long; three males had an average weight of 61.6 g (2.17 oz). It has a widespread brown morph and a rare rufous morph. Adults of the former have a grayish-brown crown; the crown and the sides of the face have prominent white spots. Its nape, like those of most Glaucidium pygmy owls, has black "false eyes". The back and rump are dark brown and the tail blackish with spotty white bands. The underparts are white with broad dull reddish-olive brown streaks. The juvenile plumage has not been described.

== Distribution and habitat ==
The subtropical pygmy owl is found on the east slope of the Andes from far southwestern Colombia through Ecuador and Peru to central Bolivia. In elevation it ranges from 1,100 to 2,000 m (3,600 to 6,600 ft) in Ecuador, between 950 and 1,600 m (3,120 and 5,250 ft) in Peru, and between 600 and 1,600 m (2,000 and 5,200 ft) in Bolivia. It inhabits humid montane forest.

== Behavior ==
=== Feeding ===
The subtropical pygmy owl is active both day and night. Nothing has been published about its diet, which is presumed to be large arthropods and small vertebrates.

=== Breeding ===
Nothing has been published about the subtropical pygmy owl's breeding phenology. It is presumed to nest in tree cavities such as old woodpecker holes.

=== Vocalization ===
The subtropical pygmy owl's song is "three or four short phrases (normally 2-4 or 6 in intervals of several seconds) of low tone increasing when ending the two notes hu-hu, hu, and having a hesitation before the last note".

== Status ==
The IUCN has assessed the subtropical pygmy owl as being of Least Concern. Its population size is unknown but is believed to be stable.
