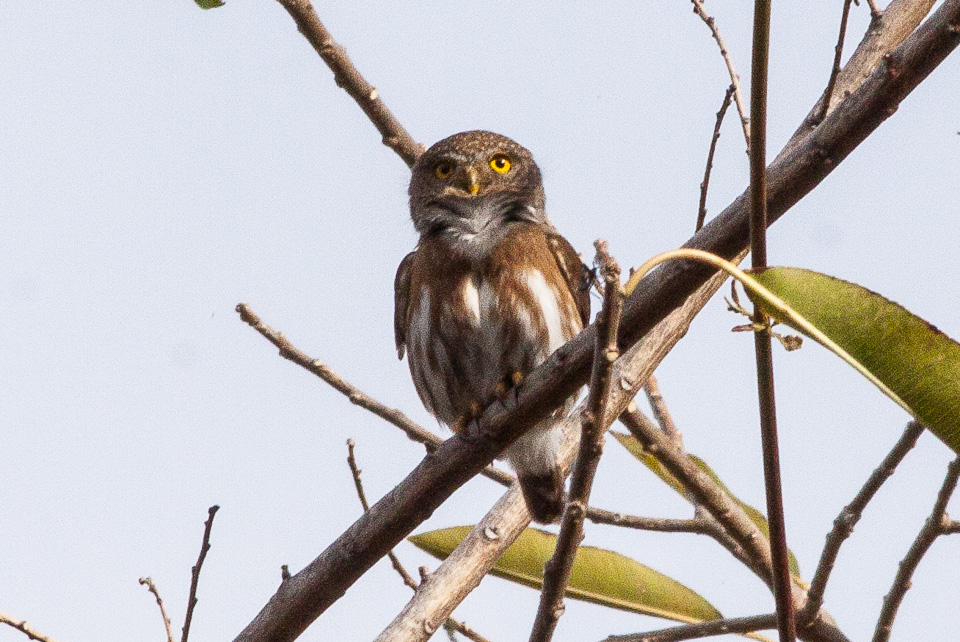

Conservation status
- Least Concern (IUCN 3.1)
- CITES Appendix II

Scientific classification
- Kingdom: Animalia
- Phylum: Chordata
- Class: Aves
- Order: Strigiformes
- Family: Strigidae
- Genus: Glaucidium
- Species: G. palmarum

Binomial name
- Glaucidium palmarum Nelson, 1901
- Distribution of Colima pygmy owl Resident

= Colima pygmy owl =

Species of owl

The Colima pygmy owl (Glaucidium palmarum) is a species of owl in the family Strigidae. It is endemic to the western part of Mexico.

== Taxonomy and systematics ==
The International Ornithological Committee (IOC) treats the Colima pygmy owl as monotypic. However, the Clements taxonomy and Handbook of the Birds of the World recognize three subspecies, the nominate Glaucidium palmarum palmarum, G. p. oberholseri, and G. p. griscomi.

== Description ==
The Colima pygmy owl is 13 to 15 cm (5.1 to 5.9 in) long. Male specimens weigh 43 to 48 g (1.5 to 1.7 oz) and females are noted as heavier without quantification. The head and back are brown, the wings mostly grayish brown, and the tail a deeper grayish brown. The head has small dull white spots. White spots show along the closed wing and the tail has oval white spots forming bands across it. The face has dull white "eyebrows" and the nape has a pair of dark "eye spots". The underparts are buffy white with wide cinnamon stripes.

== Distribution and habitat ==
The Colima pygmy owl is found in western Mexico from central Sonora south to Oaxaca, ranging from sea level up to 1,500 m (4,900 ft) in elevation. It inhabits several types of forests including thorn, tropical deciduous, lowland tropical evergreen, and the lower parts of humid montane forests. It is also found in coffee plantations.

== Behavior ==
=== Feeding ===
The Colima pygmy owl is primarily nocturnal though it is also active in daytime. It forages in the mid levels of the forest. Little is known about its diet, which is presumed to be large arthropods and small vertebrates.

=== Breeding ===
The Colima pygmy owl's breeding phenology is essentially unknown. It is thought to be socially monogamous and is presumed to nest in tree cavities.

=== Vocalization ===
The Colima pygmy owl's song is a "hollow hooting ... with [a] variable, often increasing, number of notes...[with] up to 24 notes (or more?) in [a] series."

== Status ==
The IUCN has assessed the Colima pygmy owl as being of Least Concern. Though its population has not been enumerated, the species has been described as fairly common to very common throughout its large range and the population appears to be stable.
