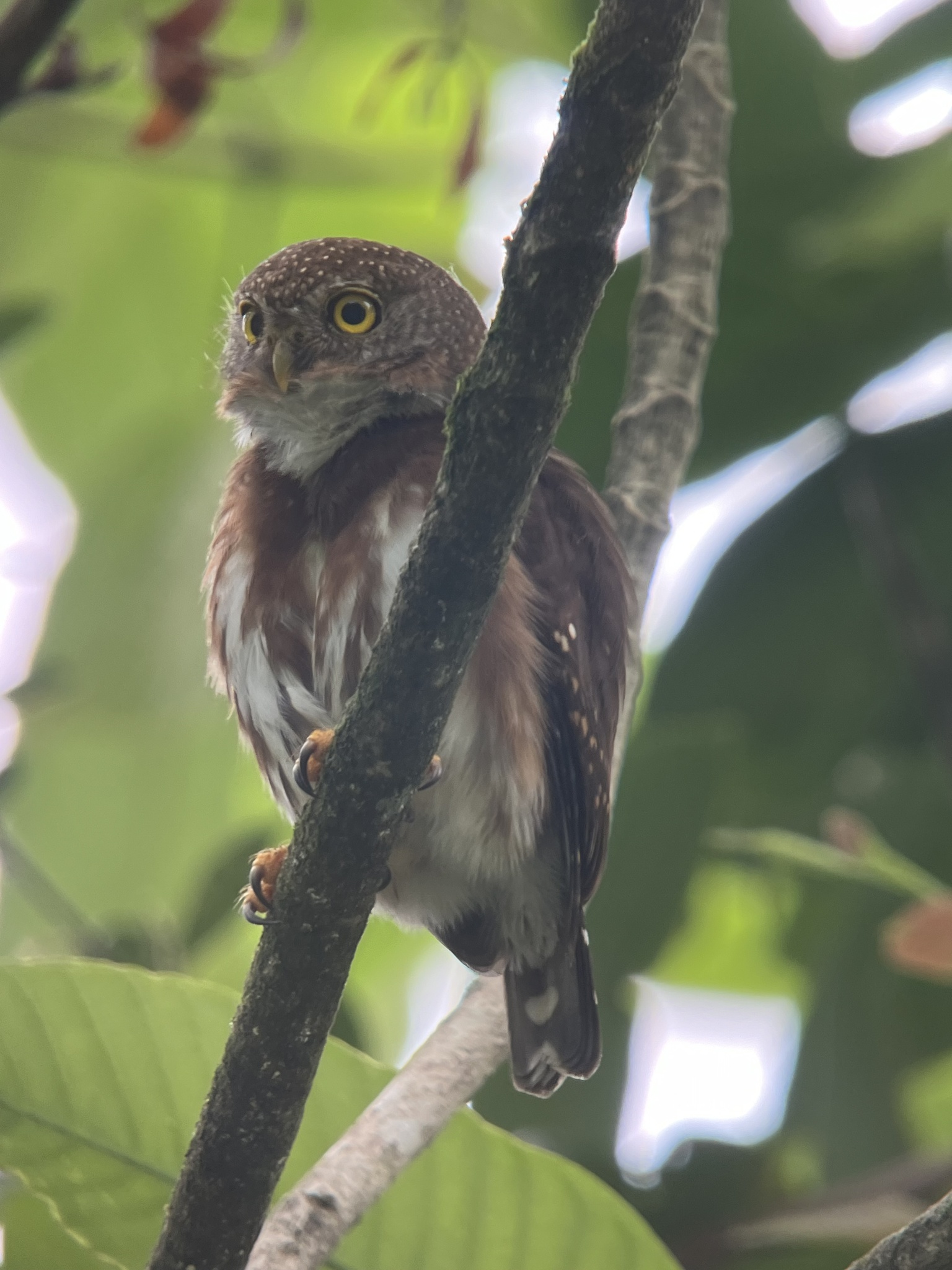

Conservation status
- Least Concern (IUCN 3.1)
- CITES Appendix II

Scientific classification
- Kingdom: Animalia
- Phylum: Chordata
- Class: Aves
- Order: Strigiformes
- Family: Strigidae
- Genus: Glaucidium
- Species: G. griseiceps

Binomial name
- Glaucidium griseiceps Sharpe, 1875
- Distribution of Central American pygmy owl Resident

= Central American pygmy owl =

Species of owl

The Central American pygmy owl (Glaucidium griseiceps) is a species of owl in the family Strigidae. It is found in Belize, Colombia, Costa Rica, Ecuador, Guatemala, Honduras, Mexico, Nicaragua, and Panama.

== Taxonomy and systematics ==
The International Ornithological Committee (IOC) treats the Central American pygmy owl as monotypic. However, the Clements taxonomy and Handbook of the Birds of the World recognize three subspecies, the nominate Glaucidium griseiceps, G. g. occultum, and G. g. rarum.

== Description ==
The Central American pygmy owl is 13 to 18 cm (5.1 to 7.1 in) long. Males weigh 50.6 to 58.8 g (1.78 to 2.07 oz) and females about 56 g (2.0 oz). Adults' crown and nape are grayish brown; the crown has buff to whitish spots and the nape dark "false eyes". Their upperparts and tail are rich brown and the tail has pale bars across it. Their underparts are whitish with reddish brown streaks. The juvenile's crown and nape are gray; the crown is unspotted and the nape's false eyes are sooty.

== Distribution and habitat ==
The Central American pygmy owl is found from Veracruz, Oaxaca, and Chiapas in southern Mexico through Guatemala, Belize, Honduras, Costa Rica, and Panama into northwestern Colombia with a gap in central Nicaragua. A disjunct populations is in far northwestern Ecuador. It inhabits lowland and foothill humid tropical evergreen forest, secondary forest, semi-open areas, and mature cacao plantations. In elevation it ranges from sea level to 1,200 m (3,900 ft) in Mexico and Honduras, 1,300 m (4,300 ft) in Guatemala, and 800 m (2,600 ft) in Costa Rica. In Ecuador it is known only between 200 and 600 m (660 and 1,970 ft).

== Behavior ==
=== Feeding ===
Though the Central American pygmy owl is primarily nocturnal, it also often hunts in daytime. Its diet is poorly known but is thought to be large insects, other invertebrates, and small lizards, birds, and mammals.

=== Breeding ===
The Central American pygmy owl's breeding phenology is almost unknown. It has been reported to lay a clutch of two to four eggs in April and May, using a natural cavity or old woodpecker hole for the nest site.

=== Vocalization ===
The Central American pygmy owl's song "begins with 2–4 equally spaced hoots, followed by [a] very brief pause, then [a] series of 6–18 very similar notes, 'huu-huu, huu-huu-huu...'". It is sometimes preceded by trills.

== Status ==
The IUCN has assessed the Central American pygmy owl as being of Least Concern. Its population is unknown but is believed to be stable.

== Additional reading ==
- König, Claus y Friedhelm Weick: Owls of the World. Christopher Helm, London 2008, ISBN 978-0-7136-6548-2
