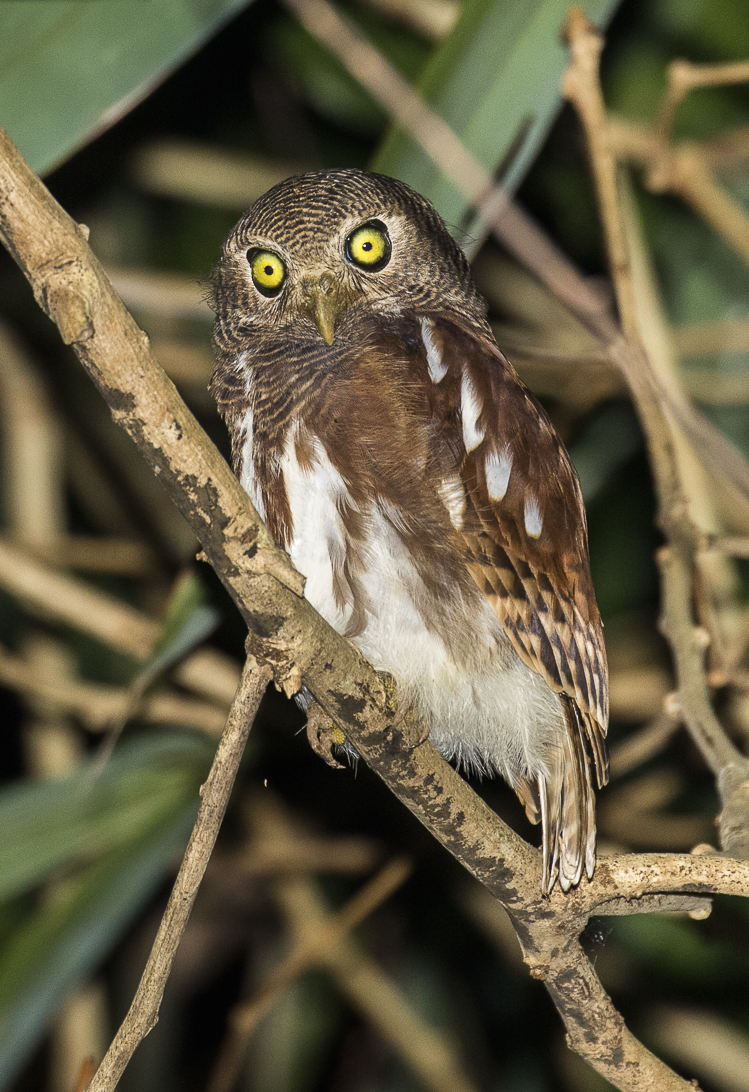

Conservation status
- Least Concern (IUCN 3.1)
- CITES Appendix II

Scientific classification
- Kingdom: Animalia
- Phylum: Chordata
- Class: Aves
- Order: Strigiformes
- Family: Strigidae
- Genus: Glaucidium
- Species: G. castanopterum

Binomial name
- Glaucidium castanopterum (Horsfield, 1821)
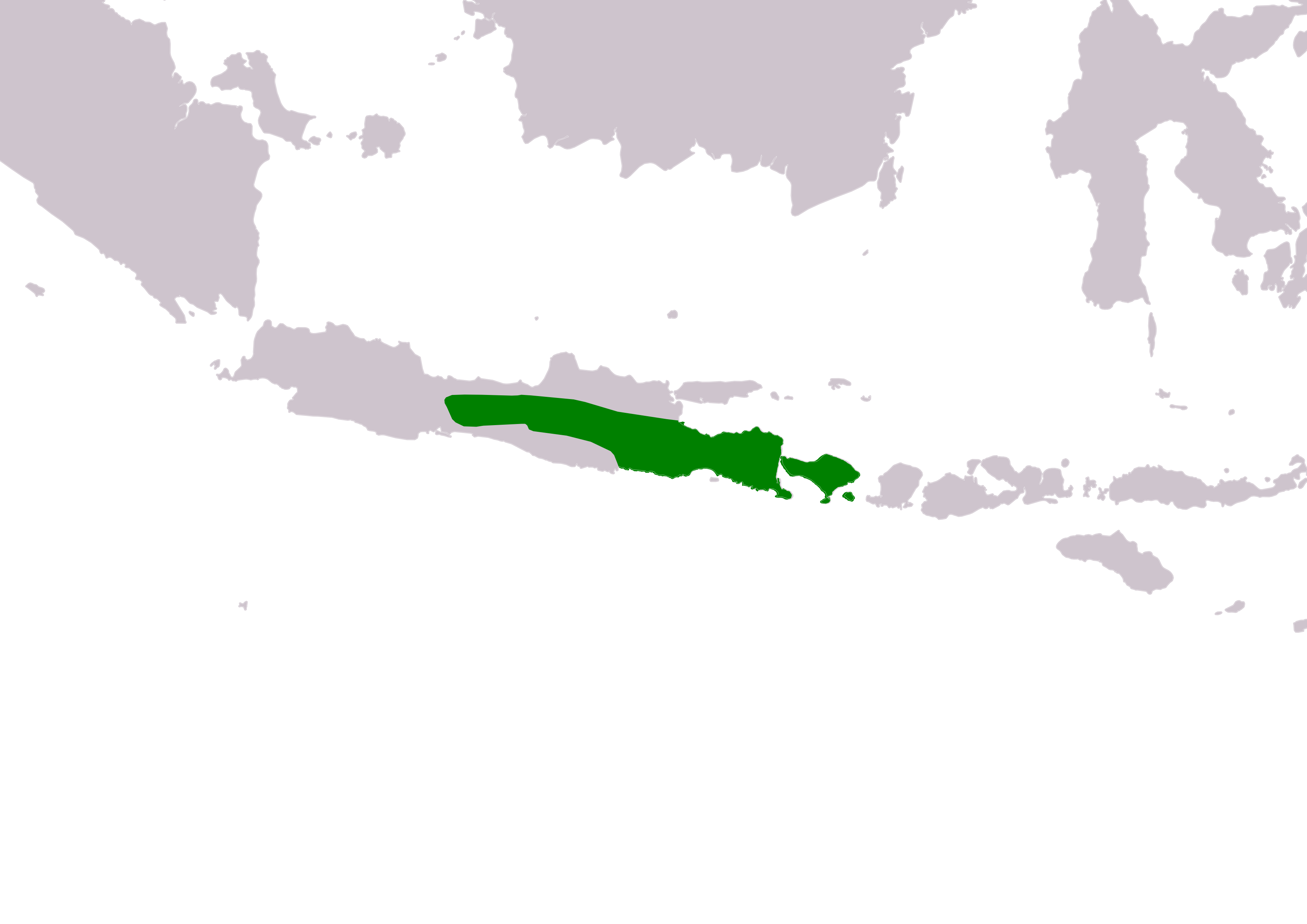
- Range of G. castanopterum Resident

= Javan owlet =

Species of owl

The Javan owlet (Glaucidium castanopterum) is a species of owl in the family Strigidae. It is native to the islands of Java and Bali.

Its natural habitat is subtropical or tropical moist lowland forests.
