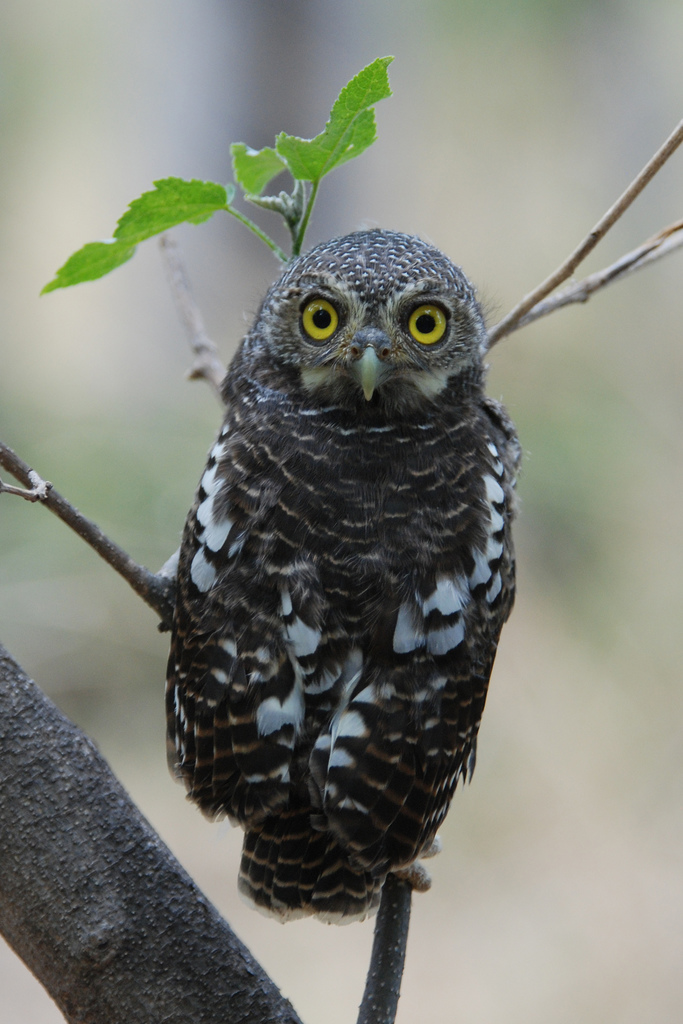
- African barred owlet

Scientific classification
- Kingdom: Animalia
- Phylum: Chordata
- Class: Aves
- Order: Strigiformes
- Family: Strigidae
- Genus: Glaucidium; F. Boie, 1826

Type species
- Strix passerina Linnaeus, 1758

Species
- See text

= Pygmy owl =

Pygmy owls Temporal range: Late Pliocene to Recent

Genus of birds

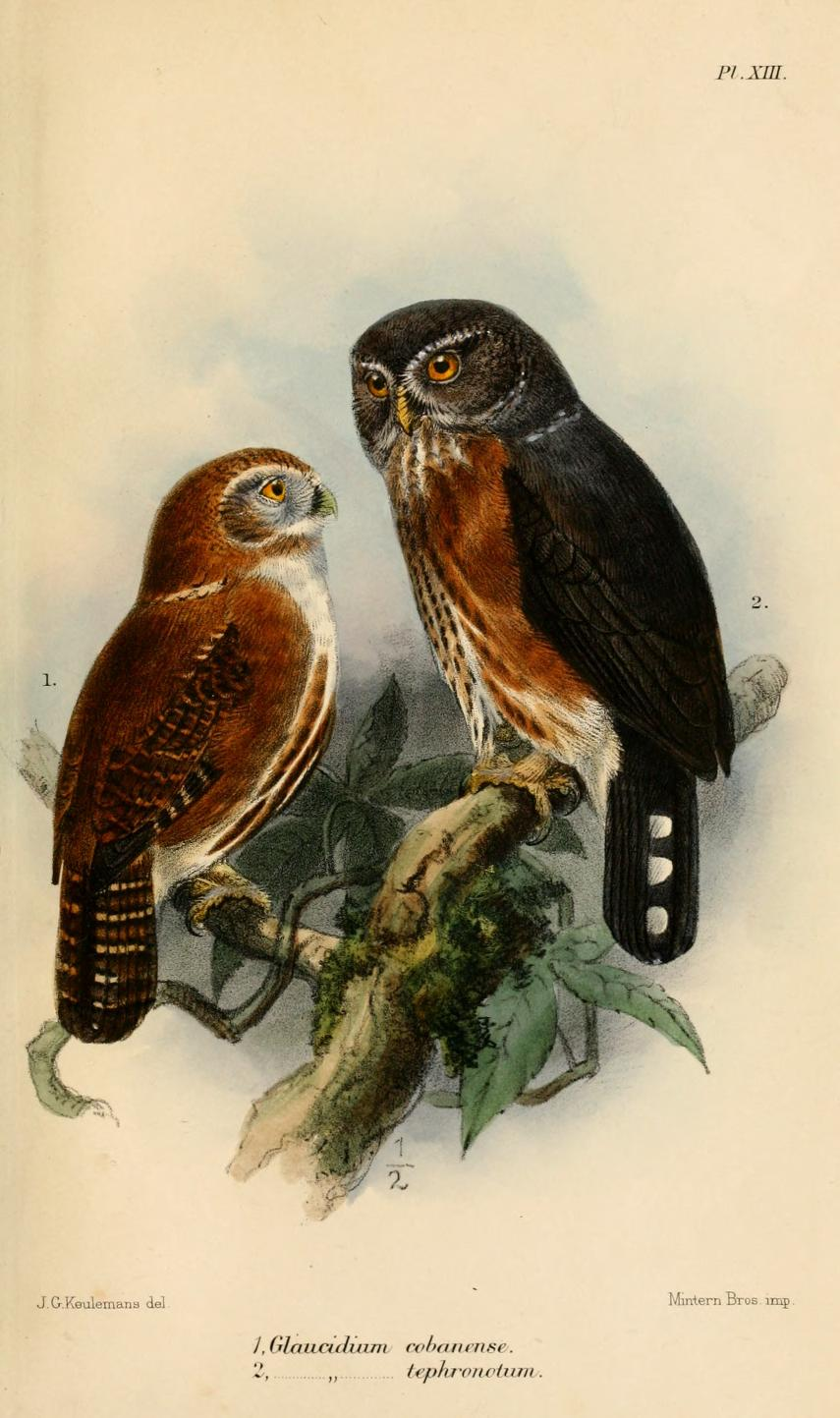
Guatemalan pygmy owl (left) and red-chested owlet (right); illustration by Keulemans, 1875

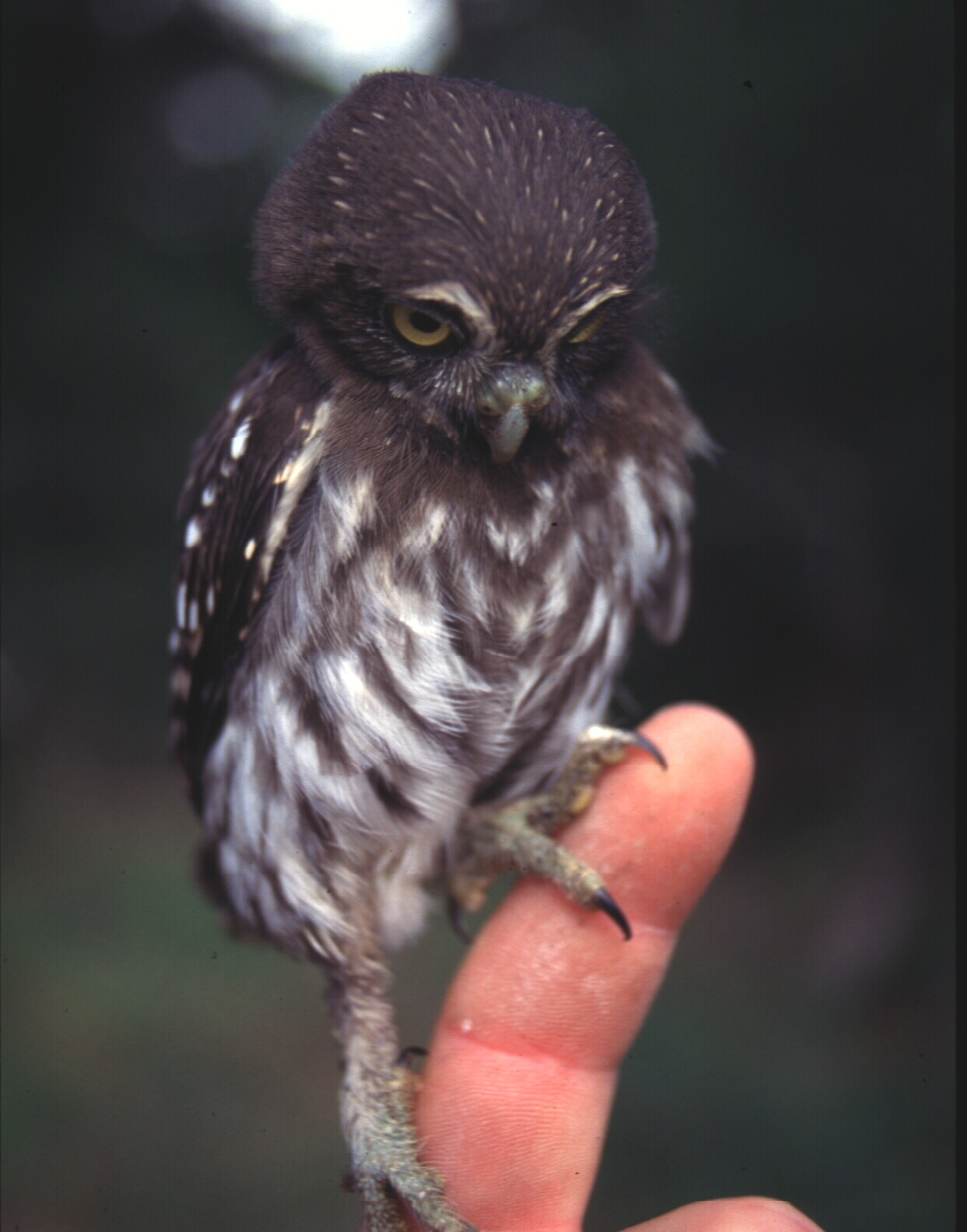
Ferruginous pygmy owl

Pygmy owls are members of the genus Glaucidium. They belong to the typical owl family, Strigidae. The genus consists of 26 species distributed worldwide. These are mostly small owls, and some of the species are called "owlets". The genus includes nocturnal, diurnal, and crepuscular species. Birds in this genus mainly hunt large insects and other small prey.

== Taxonomy ==
The genus Glaucidium was introduced in 1826 by the German zoologist Friedrich Boie. The type species was designated as the Eurasian pygmy owl by George Robert Gray in 1840. The genus name is from Ancient Greek glaukidion meaning "little owl" or "owlet". It is diminutive of glaux (γλαυξ) meaning "owl".

A molecular phylogenetic study of the owls published in 2019 found that the widely distributed northern hawk-owl (Surnia ulula) is sister to the genus Glaucidium.

== Species ==
The genus contains 26 living species:

- Eurasian pygmy owl (Glaucidium passerinum)
- Pearl-spotted owlet (Glaucidium perlatum)
- Red-chested owlet (Glaucidium tephronotum)
- Sjöstedt's barred owlet (Glaucidium sjostedti)
- Asian barred owlet (Glaucidium cuculoides)
- Javan owlet (Glaucidium castanopterum)
- Jungle owlet (Glaucidium radiatum)
- Chestnut-backed owlet (Glaucidium castanotum)
- African barred owlet (Glaucidium capense)
- Albertine owlet (Glaucidium albertinum)
- Northern pygmy owl (Glaucidium gnoma) – includes Mountain, Baja and Guatemalan pygmy owls
- Costa Rican pygmy owl (Glaucidium costaricanum)
- Cloud-forest pygmy owl (Glaucidium nubicola)
- Andean pygmy owl (Glaucidium jardinii)
- Yungas pygmy owl (Glaucidium bolivianum)
- Colima pygmy owl (Glaucidium palmarum)
- Tamaulipas pygmy owl (Glaucidium sanchezi)
- Central American pygmy owl (Glaucidium griseiceps)
- Subtropical pygmy owl (Glaucidium parkeri)
- Amazonian pygmy owl (Glaucidium hardyi)
- East Brazilian pygmy owl (Glaucidium minutissimum)
- Pernambuco pygmy owl (Glaucidium mooreorum)
- Ferruginous pygmy owl (Glaucidium brasilianum)
- Pacific pygmy owl (Glaucidium peruanum)
- Austral pygmy owl (Glaucidium nana)
- Cuban pygmy owl (Glaucidium siju)

== Etymology ==
The word "pygmy" has its roots in the Greek word "πυγμαῖος" (pygmaios), which means "of the fist," suggesting the small stature of the object in question. The earliest evidence of this term's usage to describe species in the Glaucidium genus dates back to the 1850s, believed to be coined by zoologist Spencer Baird.

== Fossil specimens ==
Kurochkin's pygmy owl (Glaucidium kurochkini) is a fossil species known from the La Brea Tar Pits that likely went extinct during the Quaternary extinction. The supposed prehistoric species "Glaucidium" dickinsoni is now recognized as a burrowing owl, probably a paleosubspecies providentiae. Bones of an indeterminate Glaucidium have been recovered from Late Pliocene deposits in Poland. Fossil material belonging to a new species of Glaucidium was described in 2020 as G. ireneae. The fossils were recovered from Pliocene/Pleistocene transitional strata in South Africa.

== Description and characteristics ==
Pygmy owls' ears, similar to other owls, are covered by feathers on the side of the face behind the eyes. To better triangulate sounds and make hunting easier, the pygmy owl's ears may be asymmetrically placed. Female owls tend to be bigger than males.

Some species of pygmy owl, including the northern pygmy owl, have ocelli on the back of their heads. These eyespots may contribute to the owls' self-defense against mobbing.

== Habitat ==
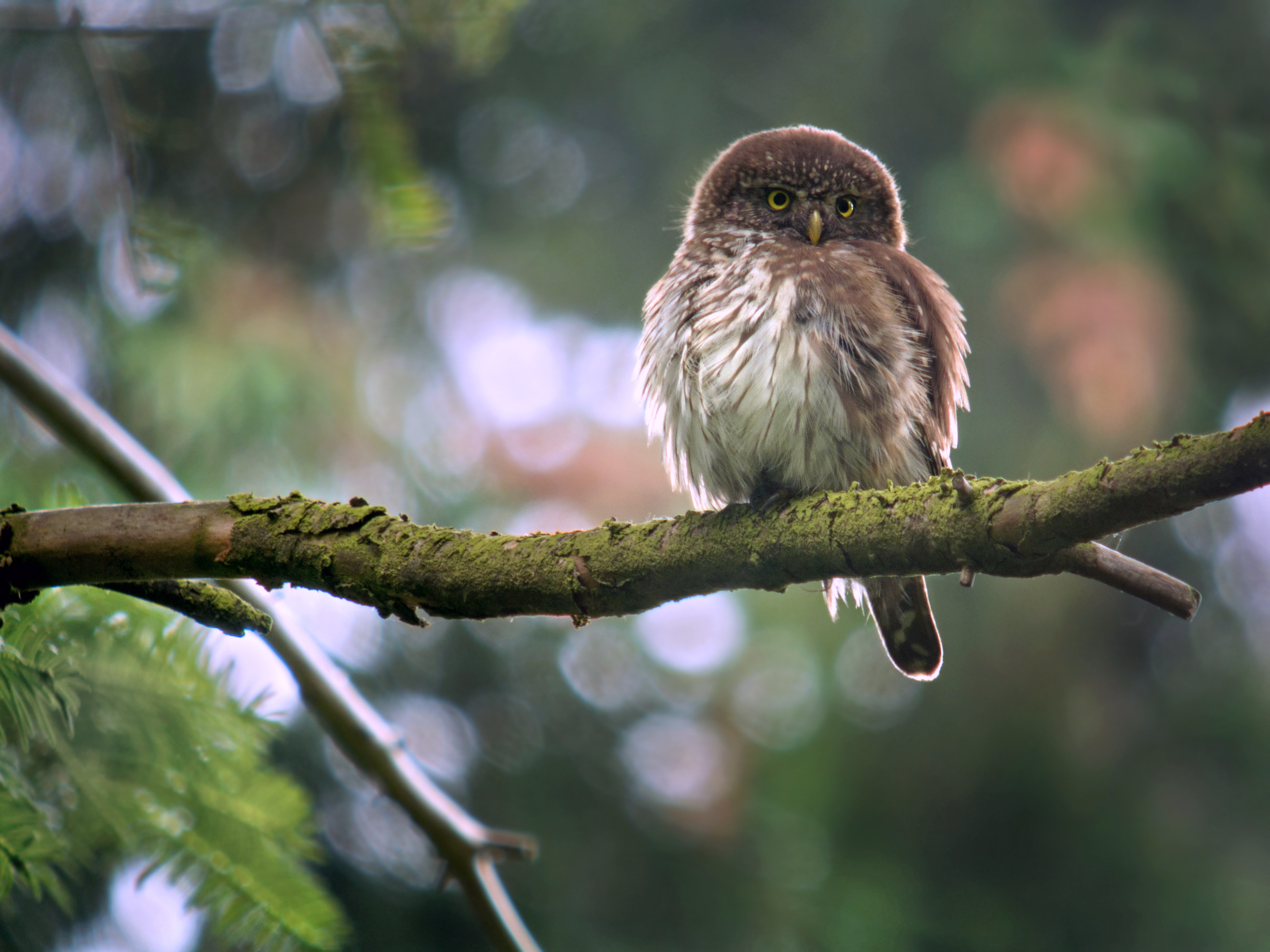
The pygmy owl in a forest environment.

Pygmy owl species are found in Europe, Asia, Africa, and the Americas. In Northern America, pygmy owls can primarily be found in western North America, with regions encompassing Canada, the United States, and Mexico. In line with the diversity of countries, these animals display incredible flexibility in terms of specific habitats by which they reside. The predominant environment they are found in is forests, ranging from temperate and moist to deciduous woods. However, they can also be found in savannas, wetlands, open woodlands, swamps, and meadows. In correspondence with this, their preference for elevation greatly depends on the region they affiliate with. However, the general range of altitudes they prefer are between 3,000 and 6,000 feet above sea level.

The pygmy owl's habitat also depends on availability in their country of residence. In Mexico, they tend to be found in pine-oak and scrub forests, while their Honduras counterparts plant their roots in highland pine and cloud forests. Due to their preferred reproduction method of exploiting tree cavities produced by woodpeckers, this forest environment works to their advantage in terms of conserving their energy finding potential nesting locations.

== Human impact and conservation efforts ==
As an inevitable and at times inadvertent consequence of human development, the pygmy owl's habitat, and by extension the animal itself, is under threat. A broader characterization of human impact on the pygmy owl is climate change, urbanization, agricultural expansion, and more. As a direct result, habitat fragmentation is occurring at an alarming rate—a rate at which the owls cannot adapt to naturally. While the general trajectory of habitat destruction for pygmy owls is that of a declining one, certain regions are experiencing more difficulty than others. For instance, California and Arizona, which typically harbor drier conditions that are exacerbated by climate change, are prime areas that have seen pygmy owl populations decline due to reduced prey and decreased vegetative environments from extreme weather and droughts.

Under the United States Endangered Species Act, the pygmy owl's critical habitat areas are under federal protection, and their recovery plan is being monitored and implemented constantly to foster long term viability. Such rebound plans are happening at the state and local level concurrently. As governments step up their efforts to protect this species from extinction, they are engaging in habitat acquisition to ensure no private activities are harming the pygmy owls. While public campaigns step up to protect this species, the fact of the matter remains that human impact continues to have a colossal influence on the pygmy owls' existence, and their numbers are decreasing at alarming rates.
