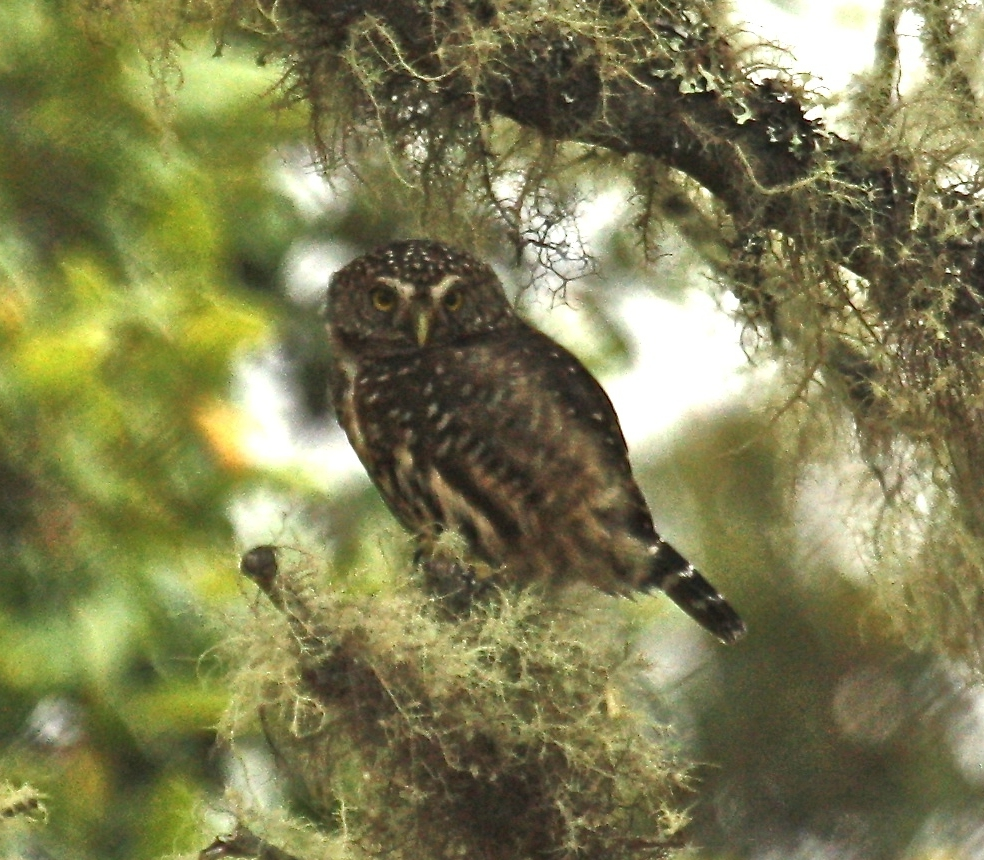
- On the road from Cuzco to Cock-of-the-Rock Lodge - Peru

Conservation status
- Least Concern (IUCN 3.1)
- CITES Appendix II (CITES)

Scientific classification
- Domain: Eukaryota
- Kingdom: Animalia
- Phylum: Chordata
- Class: Aves
- Order: Strigiformes
- Family: Strigidae
- Genus: Glaucidium
- Species: G. bolivianum

Binomial name
- Glaucidium bolivianum König, 1991
- Distribution of Yungas pygmy owl Resident

= Yungas pygmy owl =

Species of owl

The Yungas pygmy owl (Glaucidium bolivianum), is a species of owl in the family Strigidae. It is found in Argentina, Bolivia, and Peru.

== Taxonomy and systematics ==
The Yungas pygmy owl has been treated as a subspecies of Andean pygmy owl (Glaucidium jardinii) but since at least the 1990s has been accepted as a species in its own right and sister to G. jardinii. It is monotypic.

== Description ==
The Yungas pygmy owl is about 16 cm (6.3 in) long. Males weigh 55 to 58 g (1.9 to 2.0 oz) and females average 66.5 g (2.35 oz). The species has three color morphs, a rare gray one and common and widespread brown and rufous morphs. All have pale dots on the crown, back, and upper wings and pale bands on the tail. Their napes have "false eyes". Their undersides are pale with brownish streaks on the flanks and belly.

== Distribution and habitat ==
The Yungas pygmy owl is found on the eastern slope of the Andes of Peru south through Bolivia into northwestern Argentina. In elevation it usually ranges between 1,400 and 3,000 m (4,600 and 9,800 ft) but can be found as low as 900 m (3,000 ft) and in Bolivia as high as 3,900 m (12,800 ft). It inhabits montane forest and cloudforest with heavy undergrowth and much moss and epiphytes, and also Podocarpus forest. It usually is found from the mid-levels of the forest into the canopy.

== Behavior ==
=== Feeding ===
The Yungas pymy owl is primarily nocturnal and crepuscular, though it can be active in daylight. It forages mostly in the canopy and in dense foliage below it for insects and other arthropods, small birds, and possibly reptiles.

=== Breeding ===
Almost nothing is known about the Yungas pygmy owl's breeding phenology. It is thought to nest primarily in old woodpecker holes.

=== Vocalization ===
The Yungas pygmy owl's song is a "rather slow series of equally spaced hollow notes" sometimes preceded by two or three whistled notes.

== Status ==
The IUCN has assessed the Yungas pygmy owl as being of Least Concern. Its population size has not been determined but is thought to have declined since the species was described. "Forest destruction and degradation [are] probably [the] main threat[s], although inaccessibility of parts of [its] range should afford some protection."
