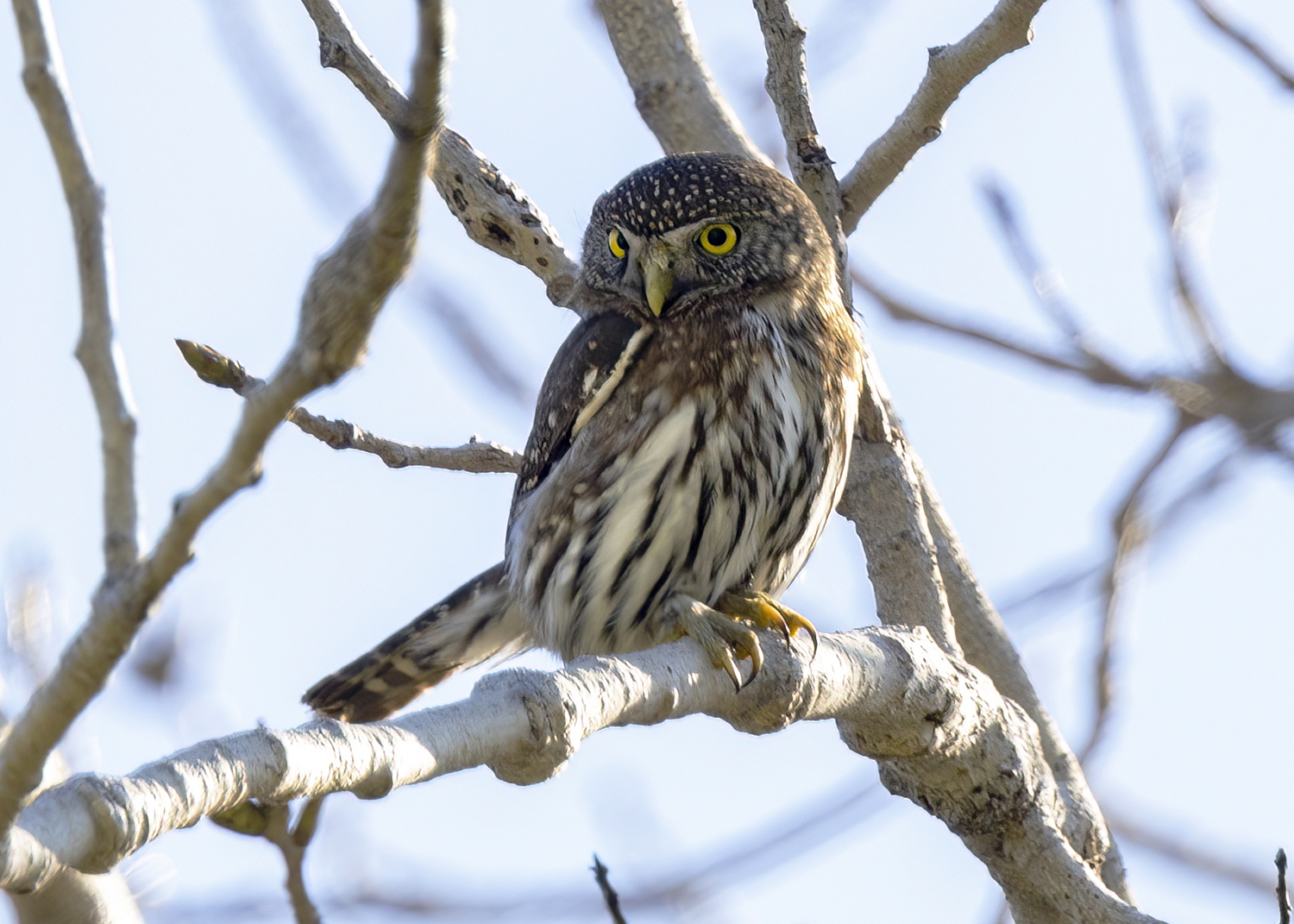
- G. g. californicum near Lake Berryessa, California

Conservation status
- Least Concern (IUCN 3.1)
- CITES Appendix II

Scientific classification
- Kingdom: Animalia
- Phylum: Chordata
- Class: Aves
- Order: Strigiformes
- Family: Strigidae
- Genus: Glaucidium
- Species: G. gnoma

Binomial name
- Glaucidium gnoma Wagler, JG, 1832
- Range

= Northern pygmy owl =

- G. g. gnoma near Tucson, Arizona

Species of owl

The northern pygmy owl (Glaucidium gnoma) is a small owl native to western North America. Seven subspecies are accepted, of which three have sometimes been treated as separate species.

== Taxonomy ==
The northern pygmy owl was formally described in 1832 by the German naturalist Johann Georg Wagler under the current binomial name Glaucidium gnoma based on a specimen collected in Mexico. The specific epithet is from modern Latin gnomus meaning "gnome", "dwarf" or "pygmy".

This species has sometimes been split into four species; the northern pygmy owl (G. californicum), the mountain pygmy owl (G. gnoma), the Baja pygmy owl (G. hoskinsii), and the Guatemalan pygmy owl (G. cobanense) based on differences in the territorial calls of males. A genetic study published in 2008 included a comparison of the mitochondrial cytochrome-b sequences of the subspecies G. g. californicum and G. g. gnoma.

=== Subspecies ===
Seven subspecies are recognized:

- G. g. grinnelli Ridgway, R, 1914 – coniferous forest of southeastern Alaska to northern California
- G. g. swarthi Grinnell, J, 1913 – Vancouver Island in British Columbia
- G. g. californicum Sclater, PL, 1857 – central British Columbia to southwestern USA and northwestern Mexico
- G. g. pinicola Nelson, EW, 1910 – Rocky Mountains (west-central USA)
- G. g. gnoma Wagler, JG, 1832 – nominate, mountain pygmy owl – southeastern Arizona to highlands of Mexico (Chihuahua to Oaxaca)
- G. g. hoskinsii Brewster, W, 1888 – Baja pygmy owl – mountains of southern Baja California
- G. g. cobanense Sharpe, RB, 1875 – Guatemalan pygmy owl – mountains of southern Mexico (Chiapas) to Guatemala and Honduras

== Description ==
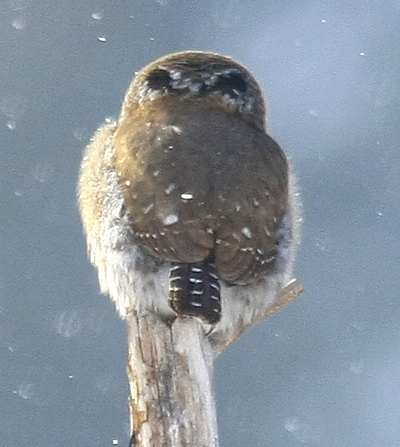
Pacific pygmy owl with eyespots behind head

Adults are 15–17 cm (5.9–6.7 in) in overall length and are gray, brownish-gray or rufous in color. This owl has a round white-spotted head, weakly defined facial disc, and dark upper breast, wings and tail, the latter quite long compared to other owls. The eyes are yellow and the bill is yellowish-green. The bird has two black nape spots outlined in white on the back of its head, which look like eyes. The mid to lower breast is white with darker vertical streaking. The legs are feathered down to the four well-armed toes on each foot.

== Distribution and habitat ==
The northern pygmy owl is native to Canada, the United States, and Mexico. Their habitat includes temperate, subtropical and tropical moist forest, savanna, and wetlands.

In Oregon and Washington they are known to nest and forage in the center of dense, continuous forests, near streams. An example of their habitat is Forest Park in Portland, Oregon, USA. Their breeding habitat includes open to semi-open woodlands of foothills and mountains in western North America.

As the northern pygmy owl inhabits both pure coniferous forests and forests with a mixture of conifers and deciduous trees, they may be negatively affected by modern forestry. This is predicted due to their dependence on mature forest for hunting, and dependence on cavities for nesting, roosting, and caching prey in the winter.

== Behavior ==
Males will regularly perch at the top of the tallest available conifer trees to issue their territorial call, making them somewhat ventriloquistic in sloped landscapes, and causing confusion among observers on the ground hoping to get a glimpse. They are incredibly hard to spot because of their size and color.

Unlike other owls, northern pygmy owls are not silent flyers. When they fly, their wings make a buzzing or whirring sound.

Like many other Glaucidium owls, as well as some falcons, hawks, and owls of other genera, northern pygmy owls possess a pair of eyespots on the nape. While their exact function is unclear, many hypotheses have been proposed. Some ornithologists believe that they may discourage predators or birds attempting to mob the owl from attacking from behind, while others believe they may instead aid the owl in capturing mobbing songbirds, either by encouraging mobbing or by diverting them away from the back of the owl and towards the front so that they can be caught more easily. One study measured the reactions of mobbing birds to wooden pygmy owl replicas, some with eyespots and some without. The researchers found that, relative to replicas without eyespots, birds mobbing replicas with eyespots were more likely to attack from the front and less likely to do so from behind. This is consistent with the hypothesis that the eyespots discourage mobbing birds from attacking from behind, as well as with the idea that they may help the owl capture mobbing songbirds by redirecting them towards the front of the owl.

=== Breeding ===
They usually nest in a tree cavity and will often use old woodpecker holes. The female lays 2–7 eggs, typically 4–6. Nest tree species may include Douglas-fir, western redcedar, western hemlock and red alder. Early in the breeding cycle males establish and defend a territory of perhaps 250 hectares (about 1 sq. mi.).

During the breeding cycle the female incubates the eggs, broods the young and guards the nest. The male hunts, making food deliveries approximately every 2 hours. The male must feed his mate, the young (typically 5) and himself. The male hunts from dawn to dusk as the young near fledging, and during the first weeks after they leave the nest. Fledging is synchronous, meaning that all nestlings leave the nest within a short period of time.

The young leave the nest (fledge) by making an initial flight that may be a short hop to a nearby branch, or an explosive burst into an adjacent tree where they land by grasping whatever branch is first contacted, sometimes clinging upside-down. Young owls at this stage are sometimes called "branchers" for their clinging, dangling and climbing behavior. The second day after fledging, the young gradually climb and fly upward into the forest canopy, where they spend their first few weeks, at times perched "shoulder-to-shoulder" with their siblings, begging for food.

Despite many statements in popular literature, no reliable information exists on the seasonal movements of this species. It is not known whether northern pygmy owls maintain the same territory or same mate year to year, though these questions are being investigated. Dispersal of young and influences on their mortality are also poorly known, though barred owls and spotted owls are known to prey on pygmy owls.

=== Feeding ===
Northern pygmy owls are purportedly "sit-and-wait" predators, though they also hunt somewhat actively, moving from perch to perch with short flights, and pursuing prey at all levels of forest structure. They swoop down on prey; they may also catch insects in flight. They eat small mammals, birds and large insects, and may take a variety of other vertebrates and invertebrates. These can include voles, warblers, chickadees, and finches. Mountain pygmy owls occasionally take prey species the same size or larger than themselves (e.g. California quail); however, small to medium-sized birds and small mammals are the norm. They've been observed eating Wilson's warblers. These owls are diurnal, and also active at dawn and dusk.

Northern pygmy owls, like many other birds of prey, can also be targets of mobbing. Mobbing of birds of prey occurs when prey approach and sometimes attack their predators. Small songbirds (ex: chickadees and nuthatches) gather to direct mobbing at Northern Pygmy-owls by flying quickly, making loud vocalizations, and sometimes even attacking to protect themselves. Pygmy owls are known to shift their diet to include a higher proportion of birds in early summer compared to the spring (mostly mammals). As such, a study published in Frontiers in Ecology and Evolution noted that mobbing tended to occur in seasons when pygmy owls tend to consume more birds. Mobbing was also more likely to occur at sites where the number of songbirds was larger. However, even when these populations were high in the winter, mobbing was rare, suggesting correlations between risk and the energetic costs of mobbing.

Northern pygmy owls may cache excess food for later; they have even been observed storing prey items on thorns.

== Conservation ==
The northern pygmy owl is not federally listed in the United States. In Oregon, it was listed as a species of concern from 1997 to 2008, but was removed due to their relative abundance in the mature, montane forests in the state. However, in other areas of the western United States such as New Mexico, it is a Species of Concern (SC2) with a PIF score of 14. In Idaho it is ranked as S3, and in Montana it is ranked as S4.

=== Effects of human activity ===
As small birds of prey, northern pygmy owls are vulnerable to many human threats. One of the biggest threats to their population is the loss of mature forests and woodlands to high-frequency, high severity wildfires (linked to temperature increases, drought conditions, and climate change). Human started fires from fireworks, downed powerlines, arson, and uncontrolled burning has also led to the destruction of these pygmy owl habitats. Furthermore, due to forest management practices and logging that removes large trees and snags, their nesting cavities are also at risk.

These birds have also been recorded visiting bird feeders to prey on songbirds, increasing their risk of hitting windows and human interference.
