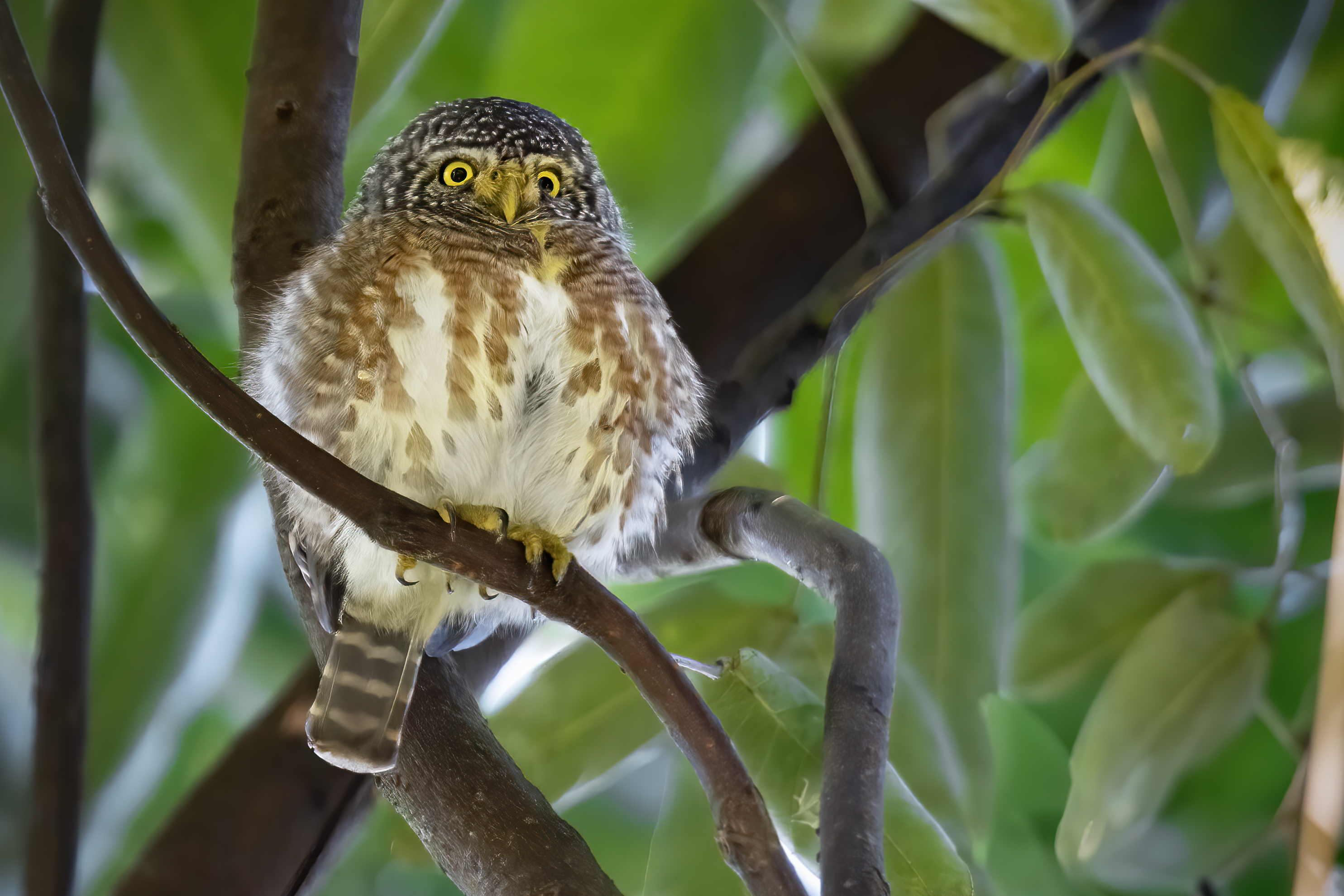

Conservation status
- Least Concern (IUCN 3.1)
- CITES Appendix II

Scientific classification
- Kingdom: Animalia
- Phylum: Chordata
- Class: Aves
- Order: Strigiformes
- Family: Strigidae
- Genus: Taenioptynx
- Species: T. brodiei

Binomial name
- Taenioptynx brodiei (Burton, 1836)

= Collared owlet =

Species of owl

The collared owlet (Taenioptynx brodiei), also known as the collared pygmy owl, is a species of owl in the family Strigidae. Its natural habitat is submontane and montane forests with open spaces and is distributed throughout oriental Asia. It is the smallest owl in Asia, at 15 cm (5.9 in) and 60 g (2.1 oz).

== Taxonomy ==
The collared owlet was first described in 1836 as Noctua brodiei by the English zoologist Edward Burton. It was moved to the genus Glaucidium based on a comparison of mitochondrial DNA sequences and proved to be closely related to the jungle owlet (G. radiatum) and the Asian barred owlet (G. cuculoides).

Two subspecies are recognised:

- T. b. brodiei (Burton, 1836) – Himalayas to south China south through Indochina and the Malay Peninsula
- T. b. pardalotus (Swinhoe, 1863) – Taiwan

The Sunda owlet (T. sylvaticum) was formerly treated as a subspecies of the collared owlet. It was promoted to species status based on the results of a vocalisation study published in 2019.

== Description ==
The collared owlet, being Asia's smallest owl species, measures between 15 and 17 cm. Females are generally larger than the males, weighing approximately 63 g, whereas males weigh in at 52 g.

This bird has a grey-brown colour (depending on age-morph) and has a barred back and flanks, while the head is more spotted than barred. They have prominent white eyebrows, vibrant lemon-yellow-coloured eyes and a white throat patch. The chin, center of the breast and belly are mostly white. The pale collar and the two black spots on each side of the nape imitate eye spots and make it seem like the owl is staring at you from behind. This is known as the "occipital face". It has a greyish-brown pale-spotted pectoral band on upper breast and lacks ear-tufts. You can see its tail when in flight, longer than most pygmy owls, and has rapid wingbeats.

=== Colour morphs ===
Collared owlets transition through various age-dependent colour morphs. A capture-recapture study of collared owlets in Taiwan provided evidence of this. On the first capture, the individual was 56 days old and showed fledgling colour morph stage; having less spots and barring on the back and top of the head and not having a completely formed occipital. On the second recapture, the individual was captured 165 days after hatching and demonstrated a rufous morph; having an overall orange-red colour, barred back, spots on the head and a formed occipital. On the third recapture, the individual was 394 days old and was in its final grey morph.

=== Vocalizations ===
The collared owlet has very unusual but distinctive vocalizations. The male produces a 4-note phrase "wüp-wüwü-wüp" repeated at intervals of a few seconds, sometimes having incomplete phrases ending in "wüwü". Their call starts mellow and becomes shriller with excitement while turning their head in all directions, creating a ventriloquial effect and making it hard to locate the bird.

== Distribution and habitat ==
The collared owlet is a resident bird in its range.

=== Distribution ===
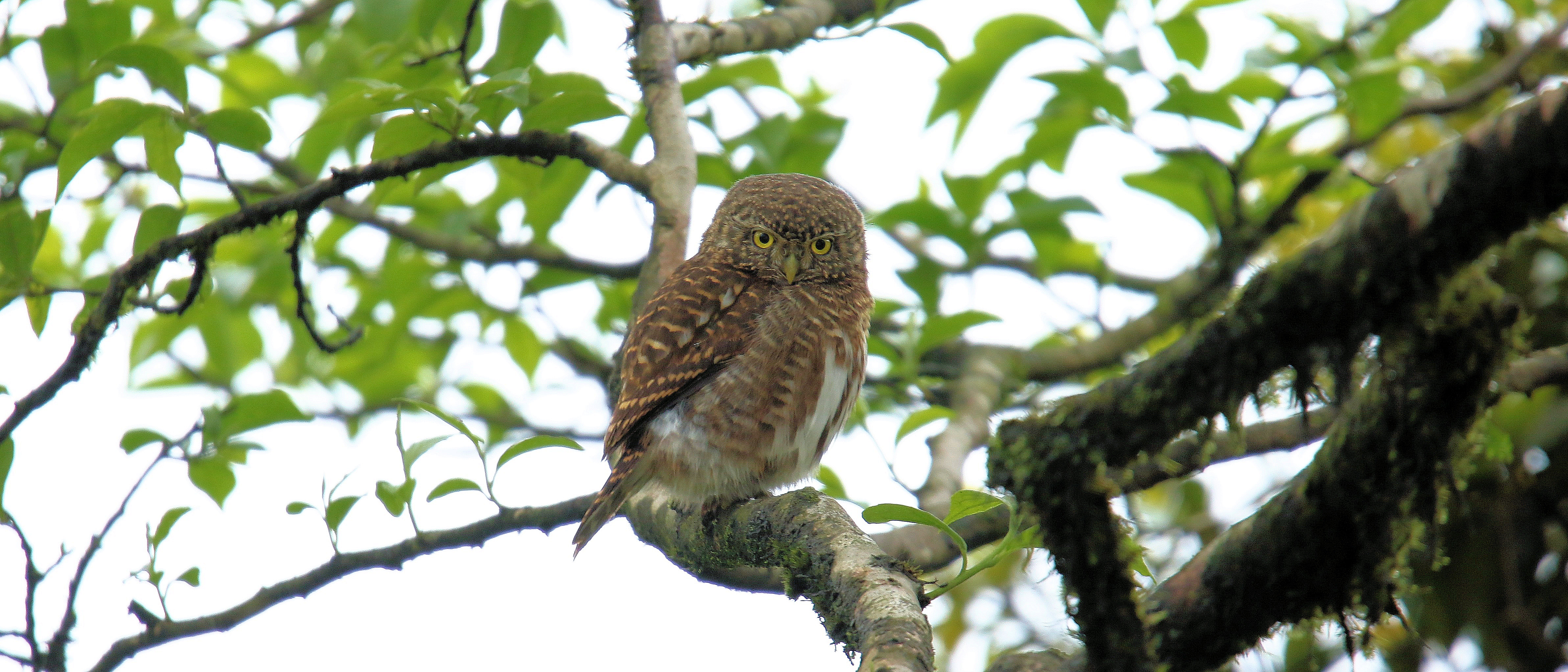
Collared owlet

The collared owlet has a very large range occurring in the Himalayas of northern Pakistan all the way to eastern China and Taiwan. Its range extends southwards through Malaysia. This bird can be found in the following countries: Bhutan, Brunei Darussalam, Cambodia, China, India, Laos, Malaysia, Myanmar, Nepal, Pakistan, Taiwan, Thailand and Vietnam.

=== Habitat ===
Their preferred habitat varies from evergreen forests, forest edges, mixed deciduous-evergreen forests with oak, rhododendron and fir and open woodlands with scrub. They can be found in submontane and montane habitats varying between 1,350–2,750 meters in altitude, but they have also been seen near cultivated lands as low as 700 meters in altitude.

Species in the genus Taenioptynx are secondary cavity-nesters. This small owl does not create its own nest, but rather nests in natural tree hollows or chambers created by woodpeckers and barbets.

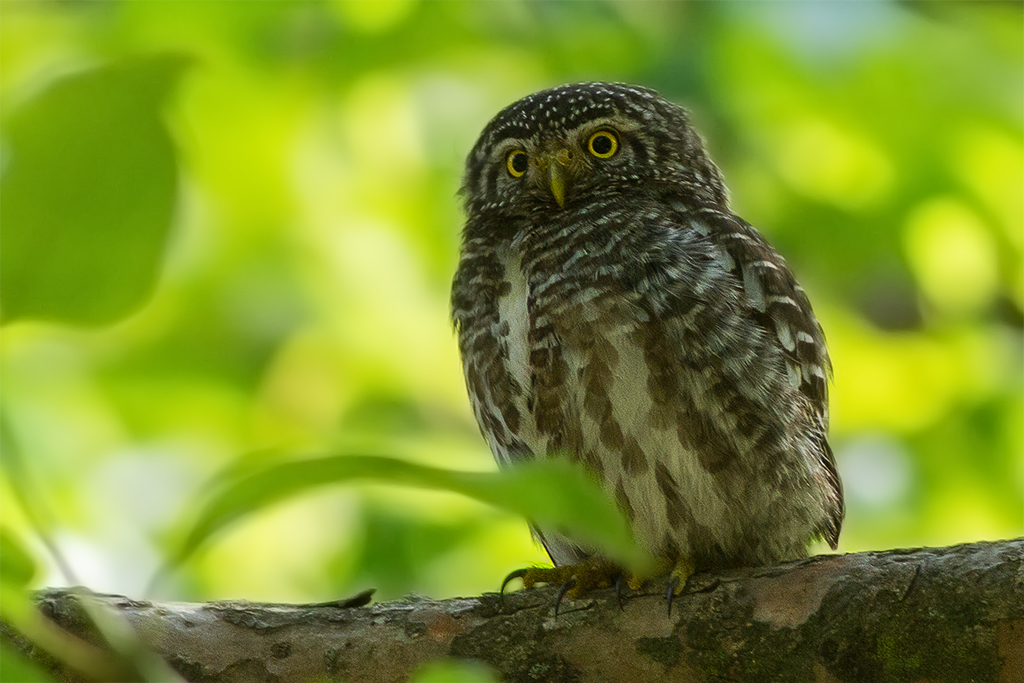
Collared owlet

== Behaviour and ecology ==
The collared owlet is most active during daylight. Being diurnal, this bird can be seen perching, hunting and calling during most parts of the day, and sometimes during the night. It is often mobbed by other small birds when roosting.

=== Breeding ===
Although not much is known about the reproductive methods of the collared owlet, it is believed that the mating couple only remains together during the period of breeding season, which is from March to April.

As mentioned previously, they nest in natural tree hollows or holes created by woodpeckers or barbets, which are often very rotten and found high in tree trunks that are in a clearing or in an open area in the forest. Clutch size varies from 3 to 5 eggs, which are round and white. The eggs are laid between late April and mid-June and their young are fledged from mid-June to early August.

=== Food and feeding ===
Few studies have precisely identified the exact diet of the collared owlet, but we can presume that it is similar to the diet of its closest relative, the jungle owlet. The jungle owlet is seen to prey on small mammals such as house mice, little Indian field mice, brown spiny mice and white-toothed pygmy shrews; reptiles such as skinks; birds; amphibians and many invertebrates. Therefore, the diet of the collared owlet consists mainly of small birds, insect, lizards, invertebrates and small mammals. Although small in size, this raptor is extremely fierce and has been seen to capture prey as large as itself. Once their prey is captured, it is brought to a perch by its talons and torn up with upward pulls of the bill.

== Status ==
Although the collared owlet is at least concern on the IUCN Red list, its main threat is habitat loss. In a study examining the effects of fragmentation on nocturnal birds in Asia, collared owlets were never found in forest fragments smaller than 100 hectares. The authors concluded that anthropogenic pressures such as deforestation can affect even small species such as the collared owlet.
