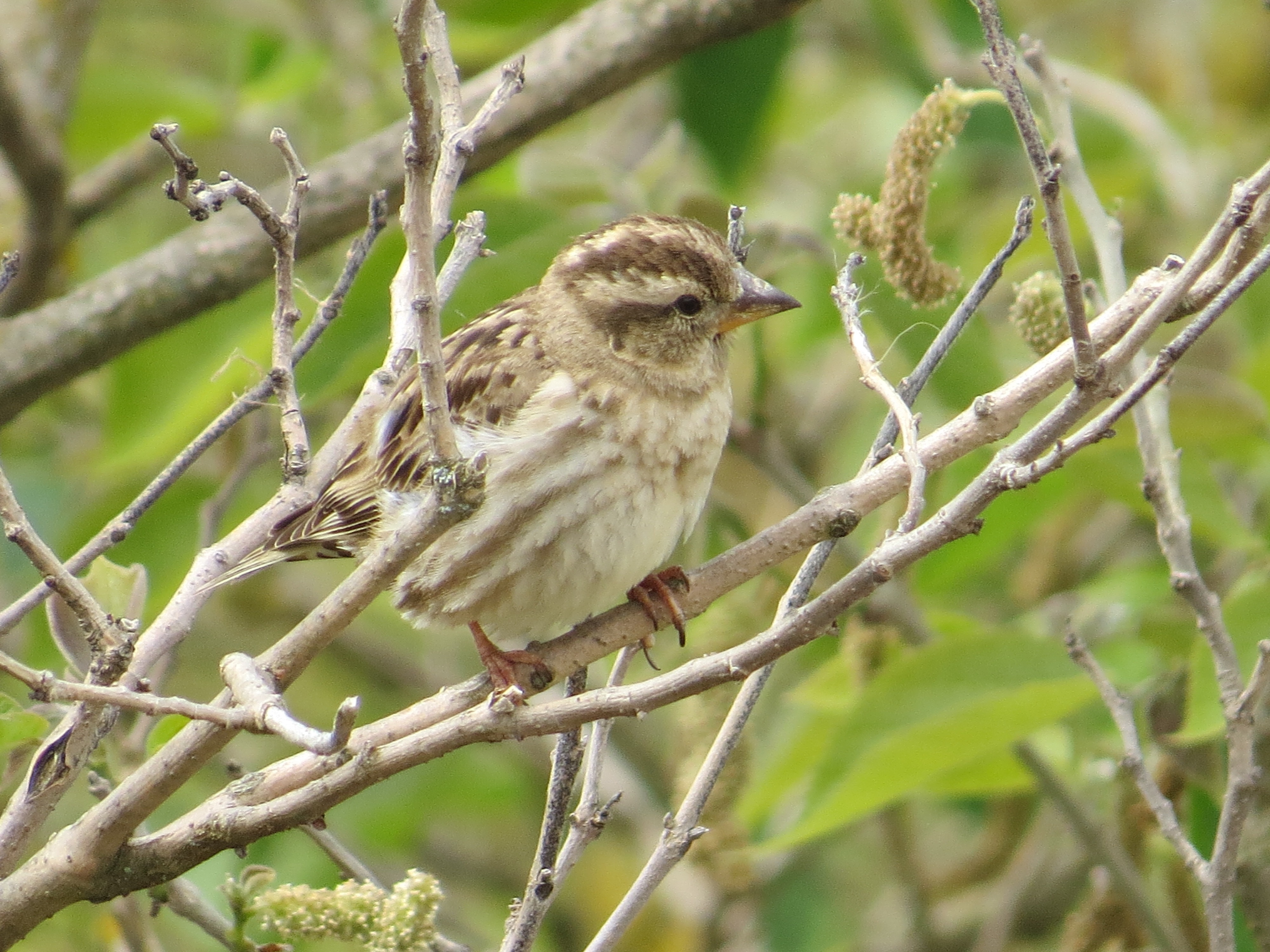
- Nominate P. p. petronia in Catalonia, Spain

Conservation status
- Least Concern (IUCN 3.1)

Scientific classification
- Kingdom: Animalia
- Phylum: Chordata
- Class: Aves
- Order: Passeriformes
- Family: Passeridae
- Genus: Petronia; Kaup, 1829
- Species: P. petronia

Binomial name
- Petronia petronia (Linnaeus, 1766)

Synonyms
- Fringilla petronia Linnaeus, 1766

= Rock sparrow =

Species of bird

The rock sparrow or rock petronia (Petronia petronia) is a small passerine bird in the sparrow family Passeridae. It is the only species in the genus Petronia. It breeds on barren rocky hills from Madeira and the Canary Islands east through the Iberian Peninsula and western north Africa, across southern Europe and through southwestern and central Asia to Mongolia and the north and west of China. It is resident in the west of its range, but some Asian birds may migrate to more southerly areas, or move to lower altitudes in mountains, in winter.

== Taxonomy ==
The first formal description of the rock sparrow was by the Swedish naturalist Carl Linnaeus in 1766 in the twelfth edition of his Systema Naturae. He introduced the binomial name Fringilla petronia. It is now the only species in the genus Petronia that was described by the German naturalist Johann Jakob Kaup in 1829. Petronia is a local name for the rock sparrow from the Bologna area of Italy.

Seven subspecies are recognised:

- P. p. petronia (Linnaeus, 1766) – Madeira and Canary Islands, south Europe to west Turkey
- P. p. barbara Erlanger, 1899 – northwest Africa
- P. p. puteicola Festa, 1894 – south Turkey to Jordan
- P. p. exigua (Hellmayr, 1902) – central Turkey to the Caucasus, north Iran and north Iraq
- P. p. kirhizica Sushkin, 1925 – Caspian Sea to Kyrgyzstan
- P. p. intermedia Hartert, 1901 – Iran and north Afghanistan to northwest China
- P. p. brevirostris Taczanowski, 1874 – Mongolia, south central Siberia and north and central China

Several other species were previously classified under Petronia, but are now placed in the related genera Gymnoris (yellow-throated bush sparrow P. superciliaris, now Gymnoris superciliaris; Sahel bush sparrow P. dentata, now Gymnoris dentata, and yellow-throated sparrow P. xanthocollis, now Gymnoris xanthocollis) and Carpospiza (pale rockfinch P. brachydactyla, now Carpospiza brachydactyla).

== Description ==
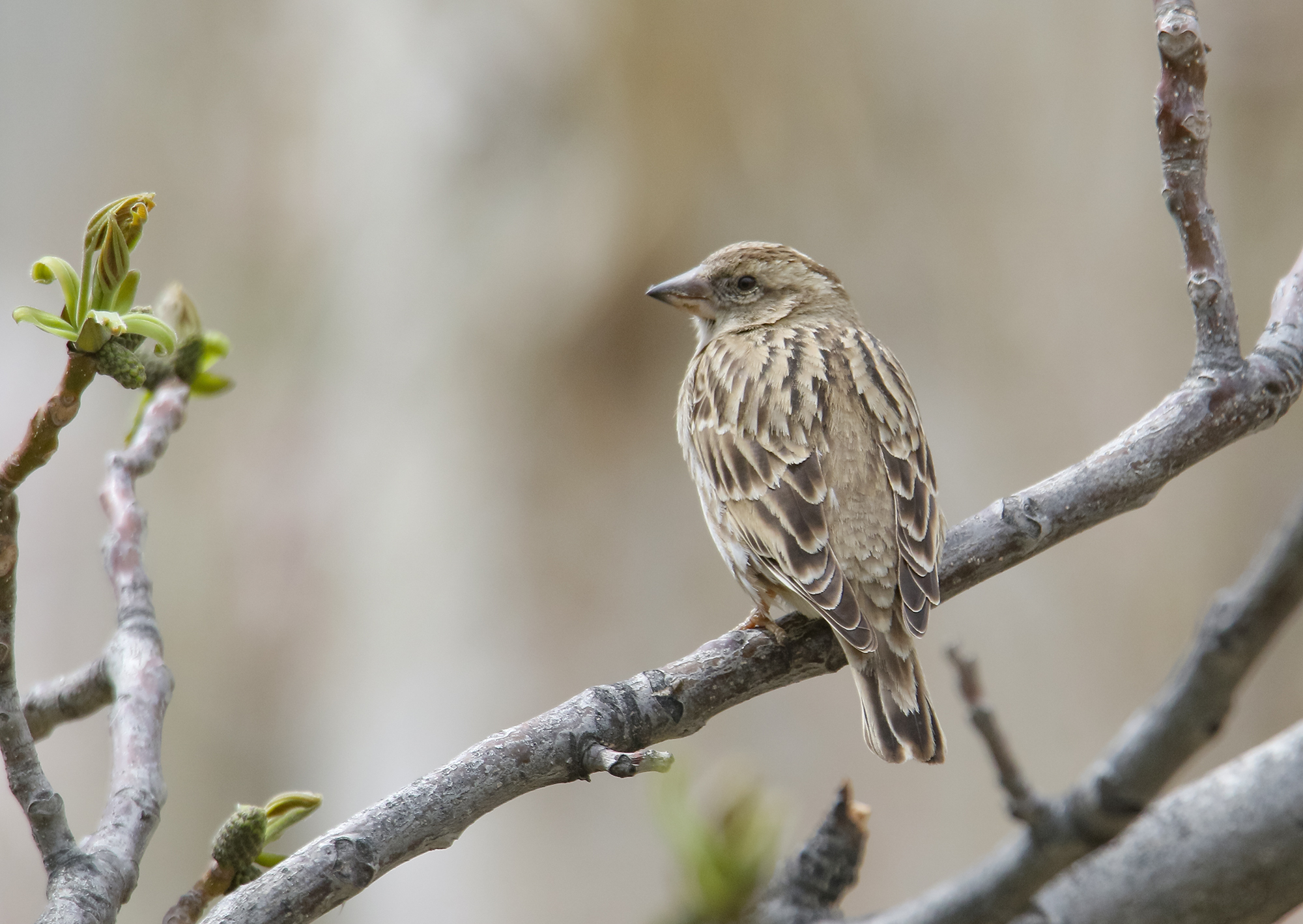
P. p. intermedia near Gilgit, northern Pakistan

The rock sparrow is 15–17 cm (5.9–6.7 in) in length, on average slightly larger a house sparrow, and with a conspicuously larger, more conical bill. It has a strong whitish supercilium and weaker crown stripe. It has a patterned brown back and wings, streaked underparts, and a diagnostic, but hard-to-see, yellow throat spot. It is largely monochromatic, with a distinctive yellow patch on their upper breast that starkly contrasts the earth tones of their plumage. This carotenoid-based trait is present in both sexes, and plays an important role during the breeding season, signalling both attractiveness and social status. This bird has a loud wheezy song.

== Distribution and habitat ==
It is a very rare vagrant north of its breeding range. There is just a single record from Great Britain, at Cley, Norfolk on 14 June 1981. This gregarious bird is also found in human settlements in suitable country.

== Behaviour ==
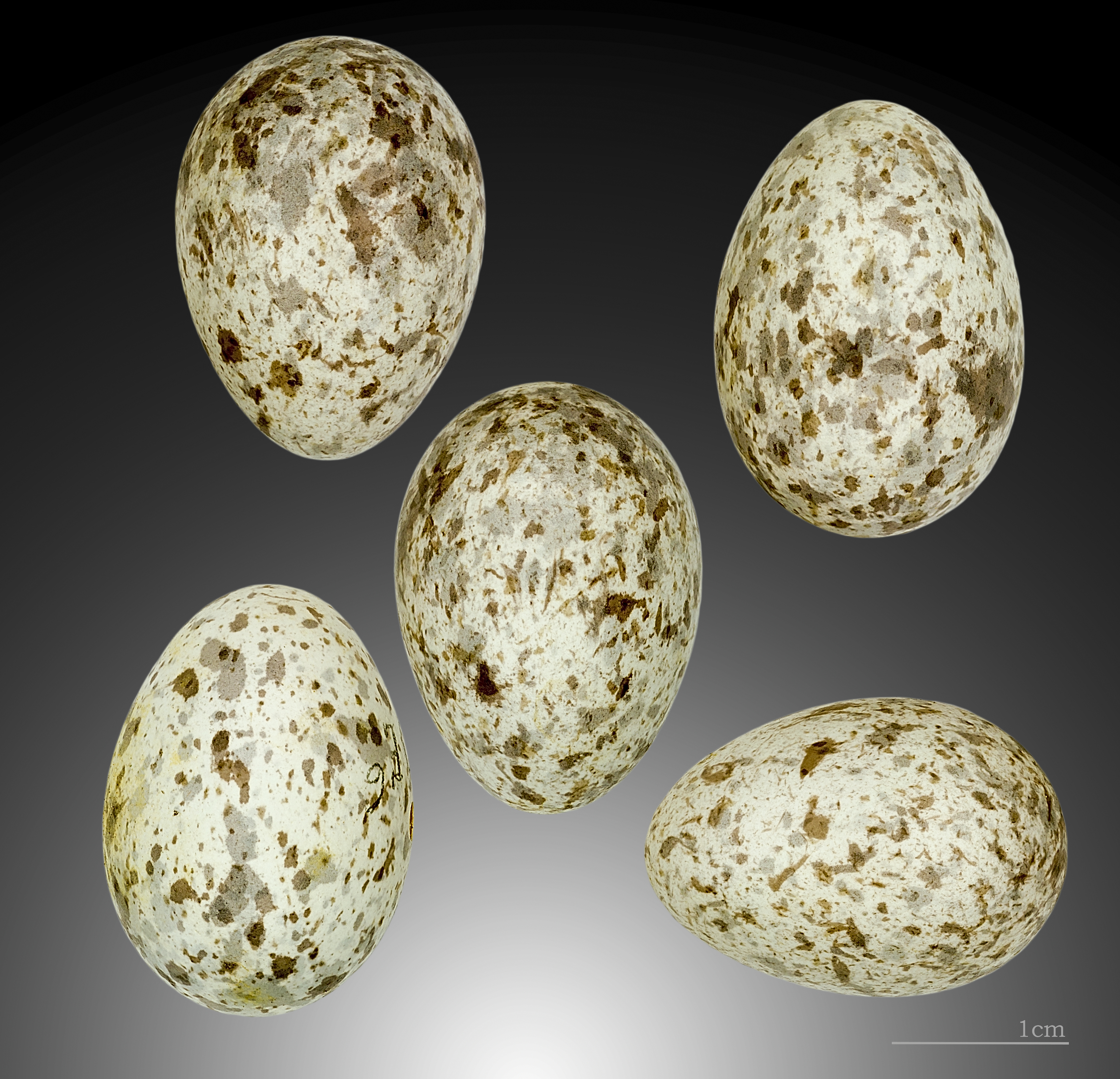
Eggs, from the collection of the MHNT

=== Breeding ===
It nests in crevices in rocks or walls, laying four to five eggs. Rock sparrows exhibit a variety of mating patterns, most notably monogamy and sequential and simultaneous polyandry; however, social monogamy is the most abundant mating pattern. The frequencies of these various mating patterns most likely vary with numerous ecological and social factors. Many studies have shown that both males and females prefer a mate with a larger yellow patch. It has also been shown that male brood defence behaviour increases with greater female ornamentation. Males also differentially allocate parental investment according to female ornamentation; this behaviour is not observed in females. In alpine colonies of Petronia petronia, females perform most of the provisioning. In Asian colonies, both males and females contribute equally to the care of the young. Males of larger sizes feed their young at higher rates, which suggests that larger males occupy better territories and/or are better fathers. Studies have found a positive correlation between male yellow breast patch size and nestling tarsus length, which suggests that more ornamented males are also better parents. Females increase the number of non-feeding visits to their nest as the season progresses, suggesting that because females have lesser opportunities to lay other clutches, it is most advantageous to support the survival of their current offspring. A positive relationship between the number of deserting females and the number of available males has been recorded.

=== Food and feeding ===
The rock sparrow mainly forages on the ground. It eats seeds throughout the year and berries in autumn. In the spring its diet includes invertebrates, particularly caterpillars and grasshoppers. These are also fed to the young.

== Sources ==
- Cramp, Stanley, ed. (1994). "Petronia petronia Rock Sparrow". Handbook of the birds of Europe the Middle East and North Africa. The Birds of the Western Palearctic. Volume VIII: Crows to Finches. Oxford: Oxford University Press. pp. 371–385. ISBN 978-0-19-854679-5.
