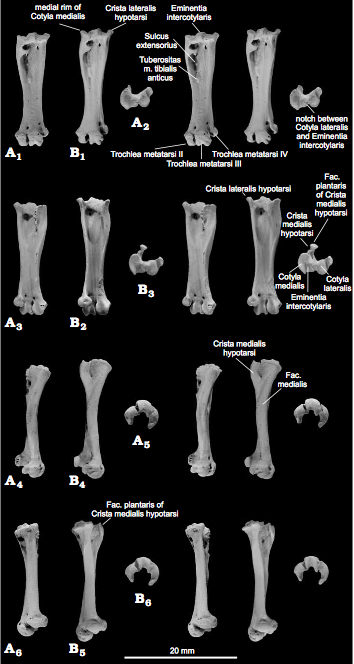
- Glaucidium kurochkini holotype tarsometatarsus in multiple views

Scientific classification
- Kingdom: Animalia
- Phylum: Chordata
- Class: Aves
- Order: Strigiformes
- Family: Strigidae
- Genus: Glaucidium
- Species: †G. kurochkini

Binomial name
- †Glaucidium kurochkini Campbell et al., 2013

= Kurochkin's pygmy owl =

Kurochkin's pygmy owl Temporal range: Late Pleistocene, 0.05 Ma

Extinct species of bird

Kurochkin's pygmy owl (Glaucidium kurochkini) is an extinct species of pygmy owl that existed in what is now California, U.S. during the Late Pleistocene Epoch.

== Discovery and naming ==
The holotype of Glaucidium kurochkini is LACM RLB K9630, a left tarsometatarsus. The paratypes are left and right tarsometatarsi, LACM(CIT) 155031 and LACM(CIT) 155032, respectively. All three specimens come from the La Brea Tar Pits in Los Angeles, California. They all also persist to the Pit A in Bliss 29 of the area. Other possible specimens that are from the area but cannot be certainly assigned to G. kurochkini are K9631, a proximal left mandible; K9632, a complete right mandible; K9210, a complete right coracoid; G50, a complete left humerus; K9635, a proximal end of a right radius; K9404, a complete right carpometacarpus; K9350, a complete left femur; K984, a complete left tibiotarsus; and K9402, K9422, and K9423, all left tibiotarsi.

=== Etymology ===
G. kurochkini was named in 2013 by Campbell et al. in honor of the late Evgeny N. Kurochkin, ornithologist and paleornithologist from the Paleontological Institute of the Russian Academy of Sciences, for his leading role in Russian ornithology and his many important contributions to the understanding of avian evolution.

== Distinguishing anatomical features ==
G. kurochkini can be assigned to Glaucidium with certainty, because it shows the features distinguishing it from Aegolius, even if the two genera are almost identical. These features can distinguish G. kurochkini from all other Glaucidium species: a crista lateralis hypotarsi that is short, broad, robust, and projecting equally proximally and laterally; an eminentia intercotylaris that is long anteroposteriorly; the presence of a cotyla medialis with the rim, in anterior view, essentially even with side of shaft; a facies medialis that is wide proximally and lateral to the crista medialis hypotarsi; a sulcus extensorius that does not extend distally to the tuberositas medialis tibialis anticus; and a trochlea metatarsi II with an anterior medial edge relatively straight in anterior view.

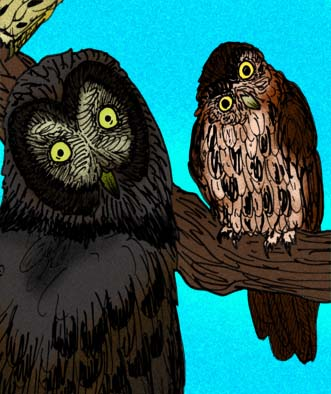
Comparison of the true owls Oraristrix brea (larger), and G. kurochkini, of Late Pleistocene, Southern California

== See also ==
- Asphaltoglaux, a very similar species also known from the La Brea Tar Pits
- Oraristrix, another, much larger owl from the La Brea Tar Pits
