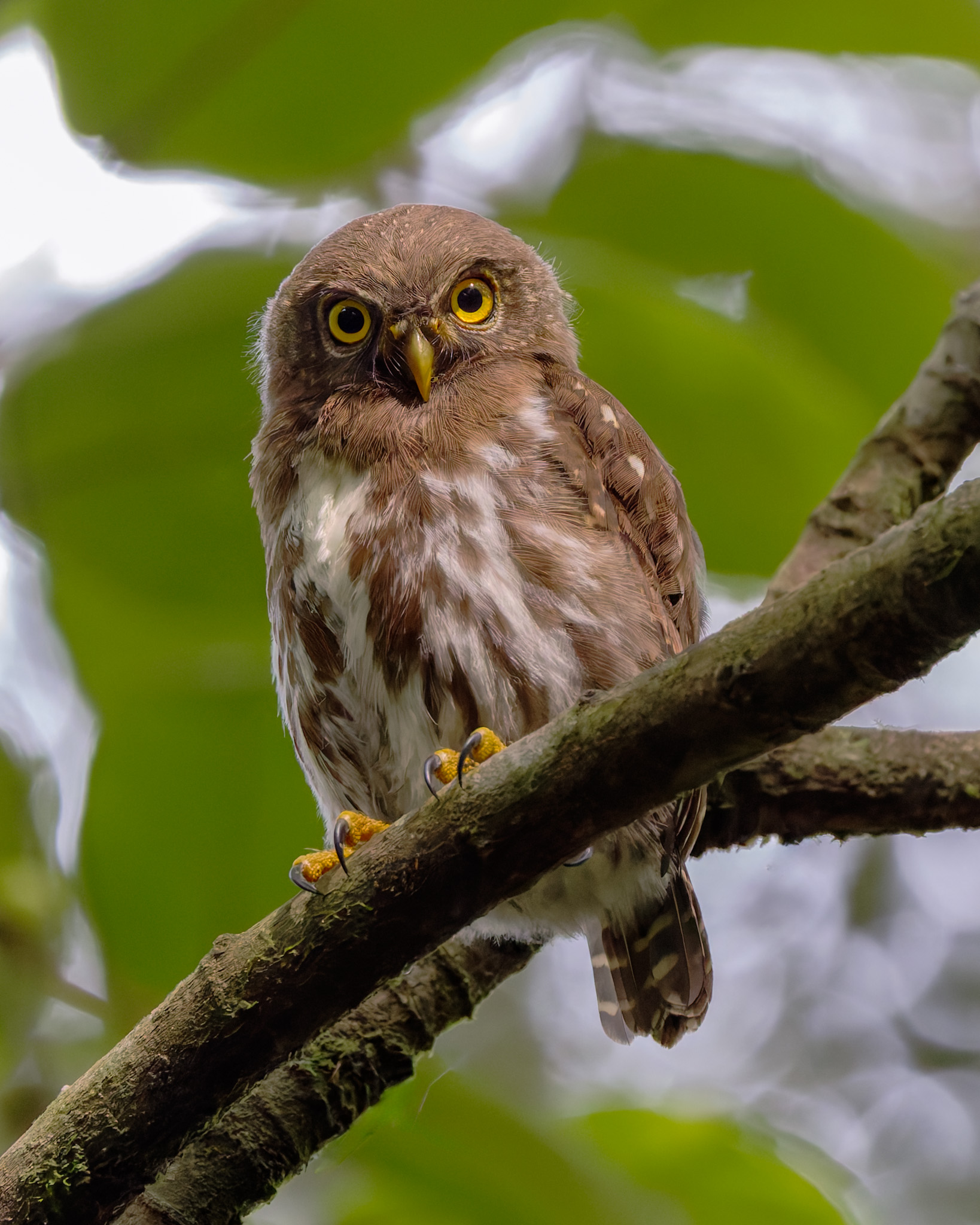

Conservation status
- CITES Appendix II

Scientific classification
- Kingdom: Animalia
- Phylum: Chordata
- Class: Aves
- Order: Strigiformes
- Family: Strigidae
- Genus: Taenioptynx
- Species: T. sylvaticus

Binomial name
- Taenioptynx sylvaticus (Bonaparte, 1850)

Synonyms
- Taenioptynx sylvaticum

= Sunda owlet =

Species of owl

The Sunda owlet (Taenioptynx sylvaticus) is a small owl from Borneo and Sumatra.

This species was formerly treated as a subspecies of the collared owlet (Taenioptynx brodiei). It was promoted to a separate species based largely on the basis of a difference in vocalisation.

There are two subspecies:

- T. s. sylvaticus (Bonaparte, 1850) - montane Sumatra
- T. s. borneensis (Sharpe, 1893) - montane Borneo
