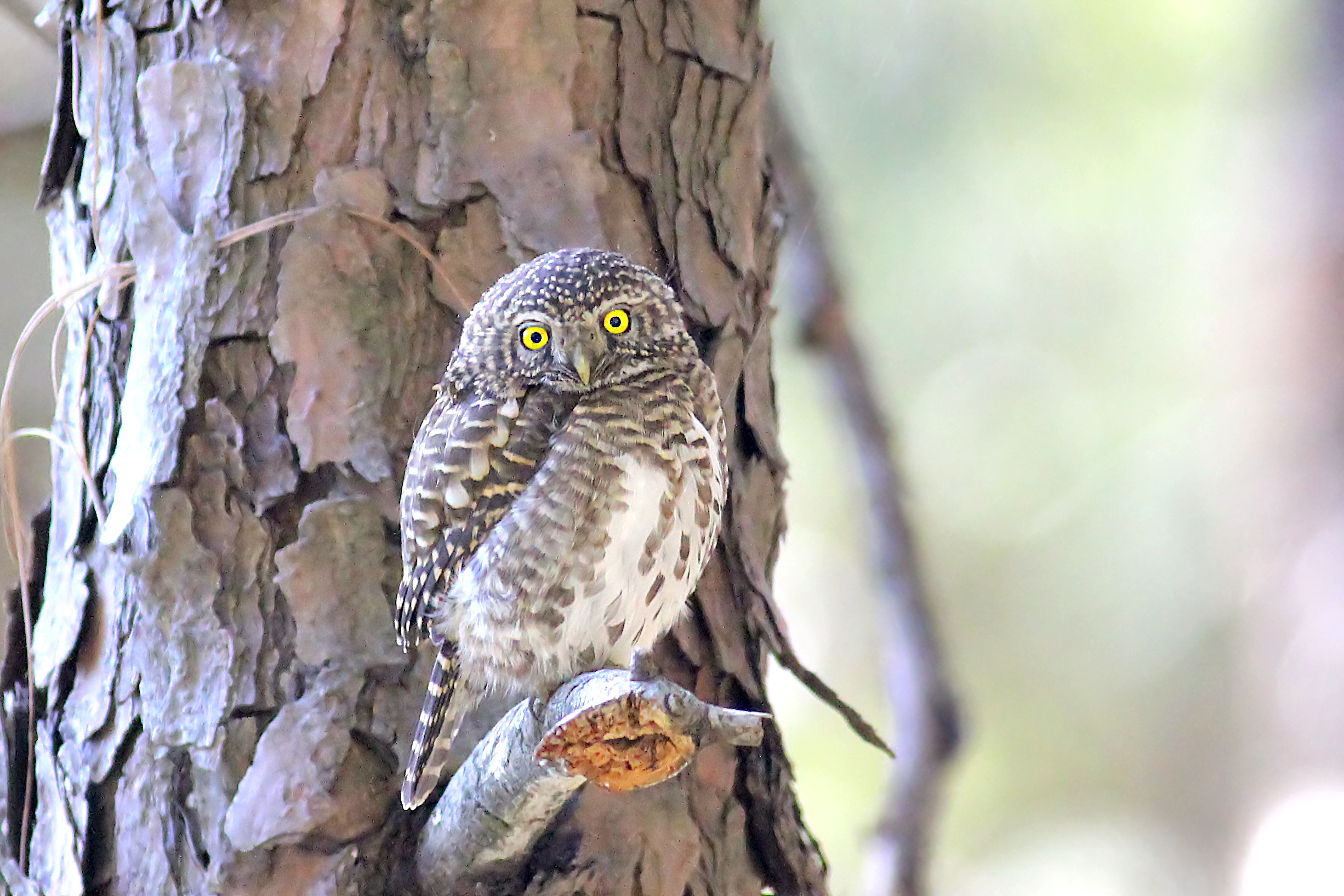
- Collared owlet

Scientific classification
- Kingdom: Animalia
- Phylum: Chordata
- Class: Aves
- Order: Strigiformes
- Family: Strigidae
- Genus: Taenioptynx; Kaup, 1848

Type species
- Noctua brodiei Burton, 1836

Species
- T. brodiei T. sylvaticus

= Taenioptynx =

Genus of birds

Taenioptynx is a genus of typical owls, or true owls, in the family Strigidae, that inhabits Asia.

The collared owlet and the Sunda owlet were formerly included in the genus Glaucidium. They were moved to the resurrected genus Taenioptynx based on a molecular phylogenetic study published in 2019. The genus Taenioptynx had been introduced by the German naturalist Johann Jakob Kaup in 1848 with the collared owlet as the type species. The genus name combines the Ancient Greek tainia meaning "band" or "stripe" with ptunx meaning "owl".

Its members are:

Image	Scientific name	Common name	Distribution
	Taenioptynx brodiei (Burton, 1836)	Collared owlet	oriental Asia
	Taenioptynx sylvaticus (Bonaparte, 1850)	Sunda owlet	Greater Sundas
