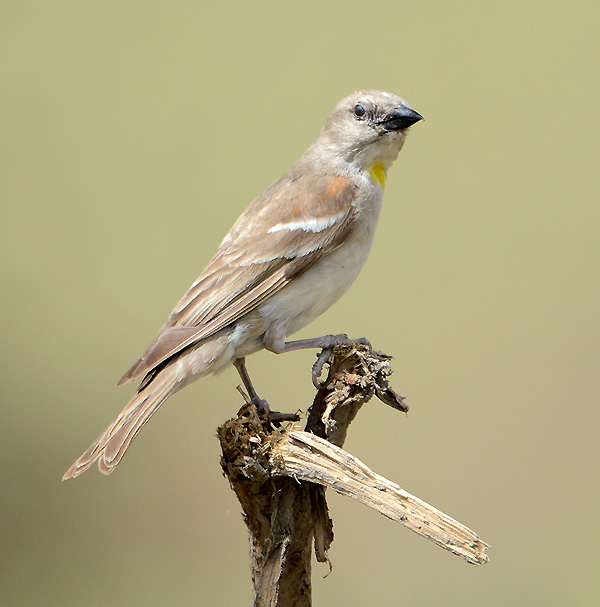
- From Haryana, India

Conservation status
- Least Concern (IUCN 3.1)

Scientific classification
- Kingdom: Animalia
- Phylum: Chordata
- Class: Aves
- Order: Passeriformes
- Family: Passeridae
- Genus: Gymnoris
- Species: G. xanthocollis

Binomial name
- Gymnoris xanthocollis (Burton, 1838)

Synonyms
- Fringilla flavicollis Franklin, 1831 (preoccupied); Fringilla xanthocollis E. Burton, 1838; Petronia xanthocollis (E. Burton, 1838) Blyth, 1845; Fringilla xanthosterna Bonaparte, 1850

= Yellow-throated sparrow =

Species of bird

The yellow-throated sparrow or chestnut-shouldered petronia (Gymnoris xanthocollis) is a species of sparrow found in southern Asia. It is a species mostly of the dry savannah. They forage on the ground for grain and for berries in bushes. They are often seen perched atop bare branches on trees while calling.

== Description ==
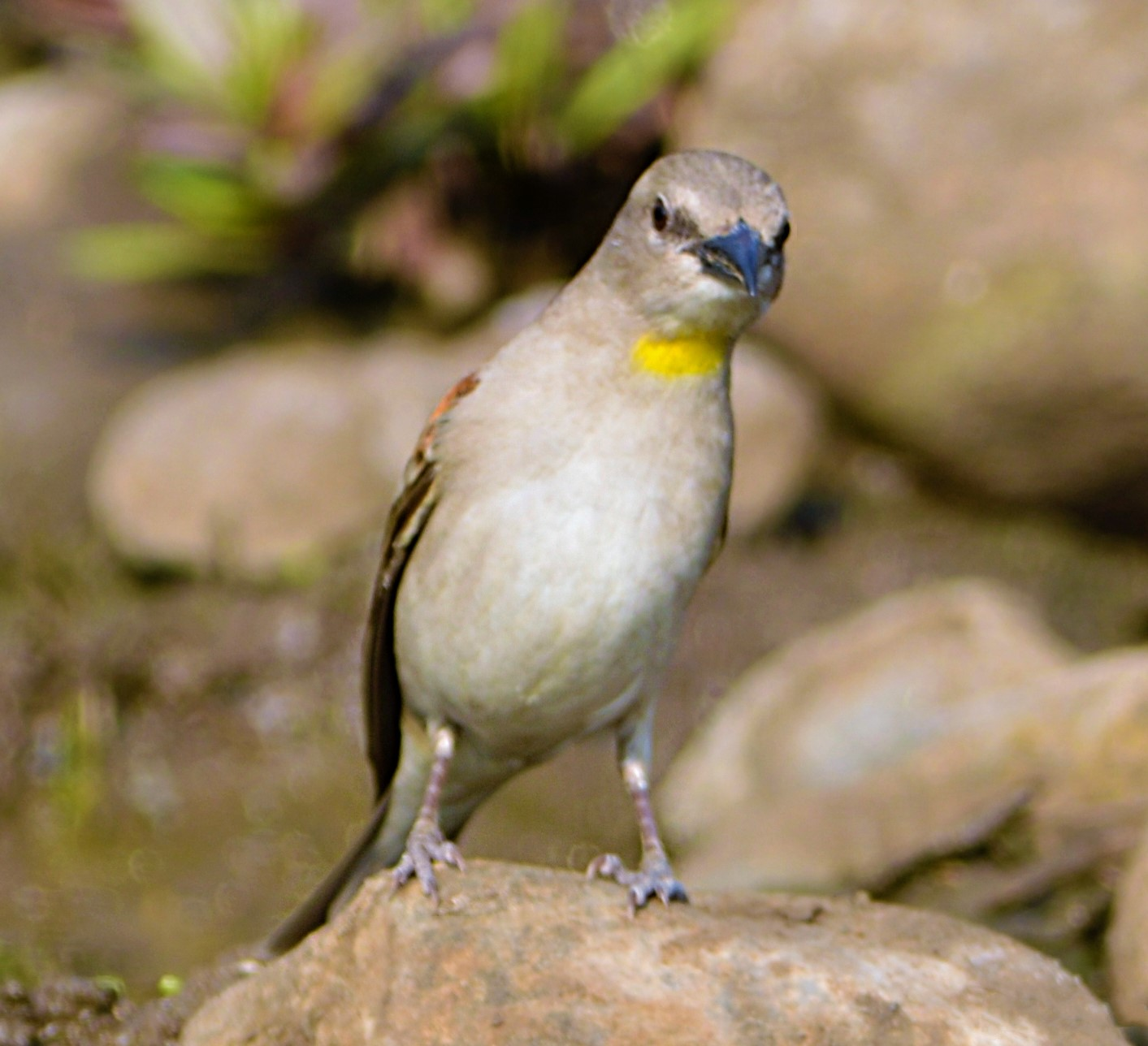
Showing the yellow throat

It has a finer bill than typical sparrows of the genus Passer and unlike them has no streaks on the plumage. The white double wing bar on the shoulder is diagnostic on the otherwise dull grey-brown sparrow. Males have a chestnut shoulder patch which can sometimes be hard to see. They also have a pale yellow spot on the throat in fresh plumage. Females are duller and lack the chestnut shoulder patch. The yellow spot is much reduced or lacking in females.

This species is tree-loving although sometimes seen on wires and on the ground, where it has a hopping gait. The usual call is a chirrup but the song is distinctive and repetitive chilp chalp cholp. It has a bounding flight and dips deeply before rising up.

== Taxonomy ==
This species has sometimes been lumped along with the yellow-spotted petronia (Petronia pyrgita) of Africa.

Currently, two subspecies are recognized:

- G. x. transfuga described by Hartert from the type locality of Bagu Kelat, eastern Baluchistan, a pale desert form found from south-eastern Turkey and south-eastern Iraq to Baluchistan, Sindh, and south-western Afghanistan.
- G. x. xanthocollis described from the type locality of Bengal near the Ganges by Major Edward Burton (1790–1867) and found in north-eastern Afghanistan, northern Pakistan and India.

== Behaviour ==
The species breeds in tree hollows from April to July, often making use of the holes made by primary hole-nesting birds such as barbets and woodpeckers. They may also make use of hollows on buildings. The nest is built mainly by the female, but males may sometimes assist. The female alone incubates the eggs, sometimes leaving the nest during the hotter parts of the day. The eggs hatch after about 12 to 14 days.

They roost communally in low bushes. Some populations are migratory, moving in response to rains.

They feed mainly on grains but also on insects, nectar and berries. An unusual food item is the petals of flowers such as those of Madhuca indica. When they visit flowers such as those of Capparis, Salmalia, Erythrina and Bassia, their foreheads are covered with pollen.

== Distribution ==
The chestnut-shouldered petronia is found from Turkey into Iran, Afghanistan, Pakistan, India, Bangladesh and as a vagrant in Sri Lanka and possibly parts of Myanmar. It is found in forest, gardens and open scrub habitats.

== Inspiration ==
This species was noted by Salim Ali (1896–1987) as key to his introduction into ornithology. As a young boy he shot a sparrow that looked different, and it was identified for him by W. S. Millard, then secretary of the Bombay Natural History Society (BNHS), who also introduced him to the literature and collections at the museum there. As a result, Salim Ali ultimately took up ornithology as a profession. In 2003 the BNHS published a tribute to him titled Petronia, the generic name then in use for the yellow-throated sparrow.

== Gallery ==
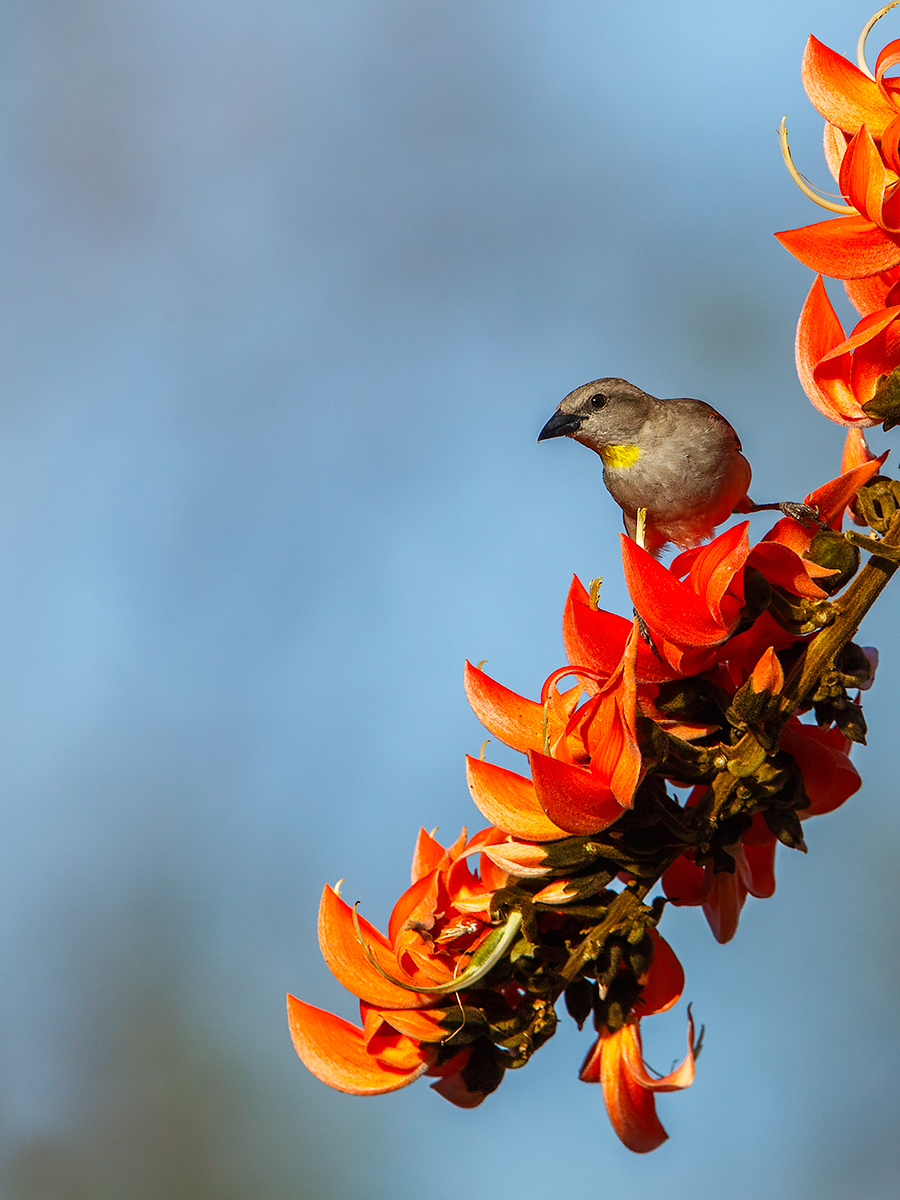
Chestnut Shouldered Petronia at Gir Forest National Park

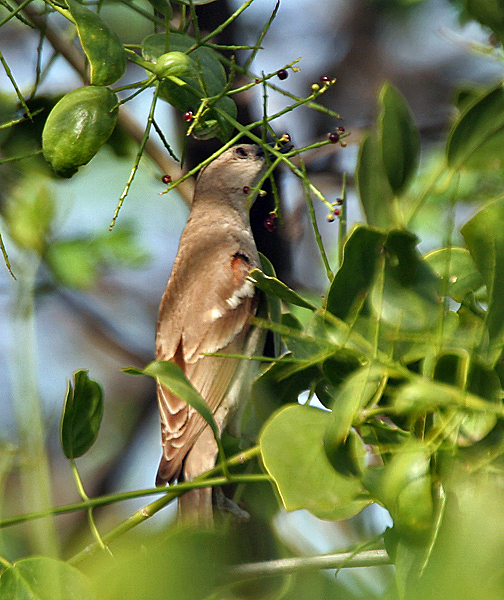
Feeding, at Keoladeo National Park

Singing Yellow-throated Sparrow at Malai Mahadeshwara Wildlife Sanctuary
