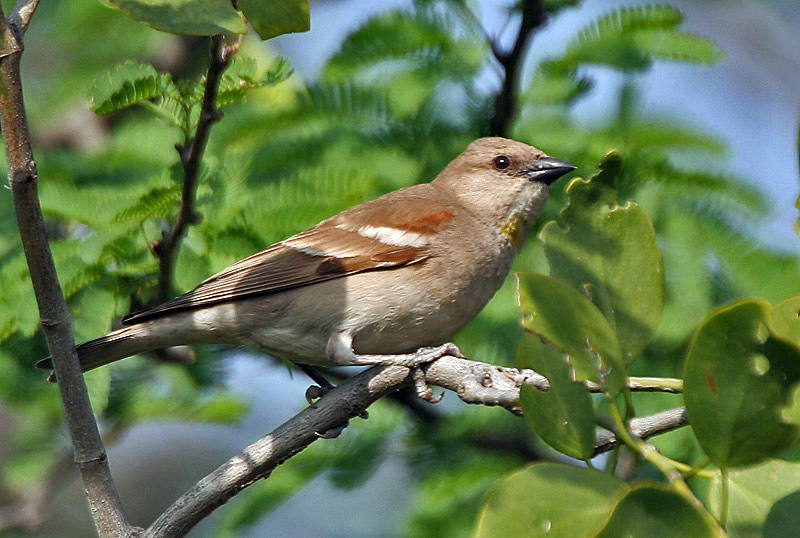
- Yellow-throated sparrow (Gymnoris xanthocollis)

Scientific classification
- Kingdom: Animalia
- Phylum: Chordata
- Class: Aves
- Order: Passeriformes
- Family: Passeridae
- Genus: Gymnoris; Blyth, 1845

Type species
- Fringilla flavicollis Franklin, 1831

Species
- See text

= Gymnoris =

Genus of birds

Gymnoris is a genus of passerine birds in the sparrow family Passeridae. Three species are found in Africa while the yellow-throated sparrow ranges from Turkey to India.

The genus was introduced by the English zoologist Edward Blyth in 1845 with the yellow-throated sparrow as the type species. The name combines the Ancient Greek words gumnos "bare" or "naked" and rhinos "nostrils".

== Species ==
There are four species recognized:

Genus Gymnoris – Blyth, 1845 – four species
Common name	Scientific name and subspecies	Range	Size and ecology	IUCN status and estimated population
Yellow-spotted bush sparrow	Gymnoris pyrgita (Heuglin, 1862)	the Sahel and the Horn of Africa	Size: Habitat: Diet:	LC
Yellow-throated bush sparrow	Gymnoris superciliaris Blyth, 1845	south-central and southern Africa	Size: Habitat: Diet:	LC
Sahel bush sparrow	Gymnoris dentata (Sundevall, 1850)	Africa from Mauritania to Guinea and east to Eritrea and the south-western Arabian Peninsula	Size: Habitat: Diet:	LC
Yellow-throated sparrow	Gymnoris xanthocollis (Burton, 1838) Two subspecies: G. x. transfuga; G. x. xanthocollis	southern Asia	Size: Habitat: Diet:	LC

These species are sometimes placed in the genus Petronia.
