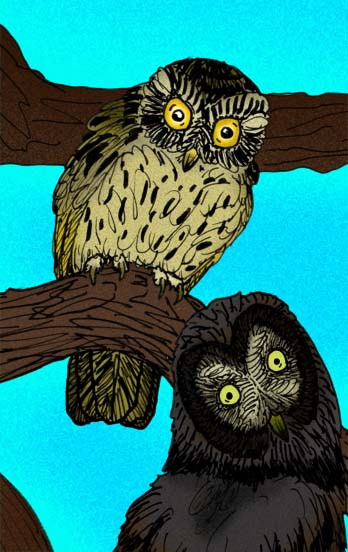
- Comparison of A. cecileae and Oraristrix

Scientific classification
- Kingdom: Animalia
- Phylum: Chordata
- Class: Aves
- Order: Strigiformes
- Family: Strigidae
- Genus: †Asphaltoglaux; Cambell & Bocheński, 2012
- Species: †A. cecileae

Binomial name
- †Asphaltoglaux cecileae Cambell & Bocheński, 2012

= Asphalt miniature owl =

Asphalt miniature owl Temporal range: Late Pleistocene

Extinct species of owl

The asphalt miniature owl (Asphaltoglaux cecileae) is an extinct species of true owl that inhabited what is now California, United States during the Late Pleistocene epoch. The species is known from fossil material recovered from the La Brea Tar Pits. Its osteological characteristics suggests a close evolutionary relationship with owls of the genus Aegolius.

== See also ==
- Glaucidium kurochkini, a very similar species also known from the La Brea Tar Pits
- Oraristrix, another, much larger owl from the La Brea Tar Pits
