= Intulula =

Intulula Temporal range: Early Miocene

Scientific classification
- Kingdom: Animalia
- Phylum: Chordata
- Class: Aves
- Order: Strigiformes
- Family: Strigidae
- Genus: †Intulula
- Species: †I. tinnipara

Binomial name
- †Intulula tinnipara Mlíkovský, 1998

Extinct genus of owls

Intulula is an extinct genus of strigid that lived during the Early Miocene. It contains the single species Intulula tinnipara.

== Distribution ==
Intulula tinnipara fossils are known from Czechia.
