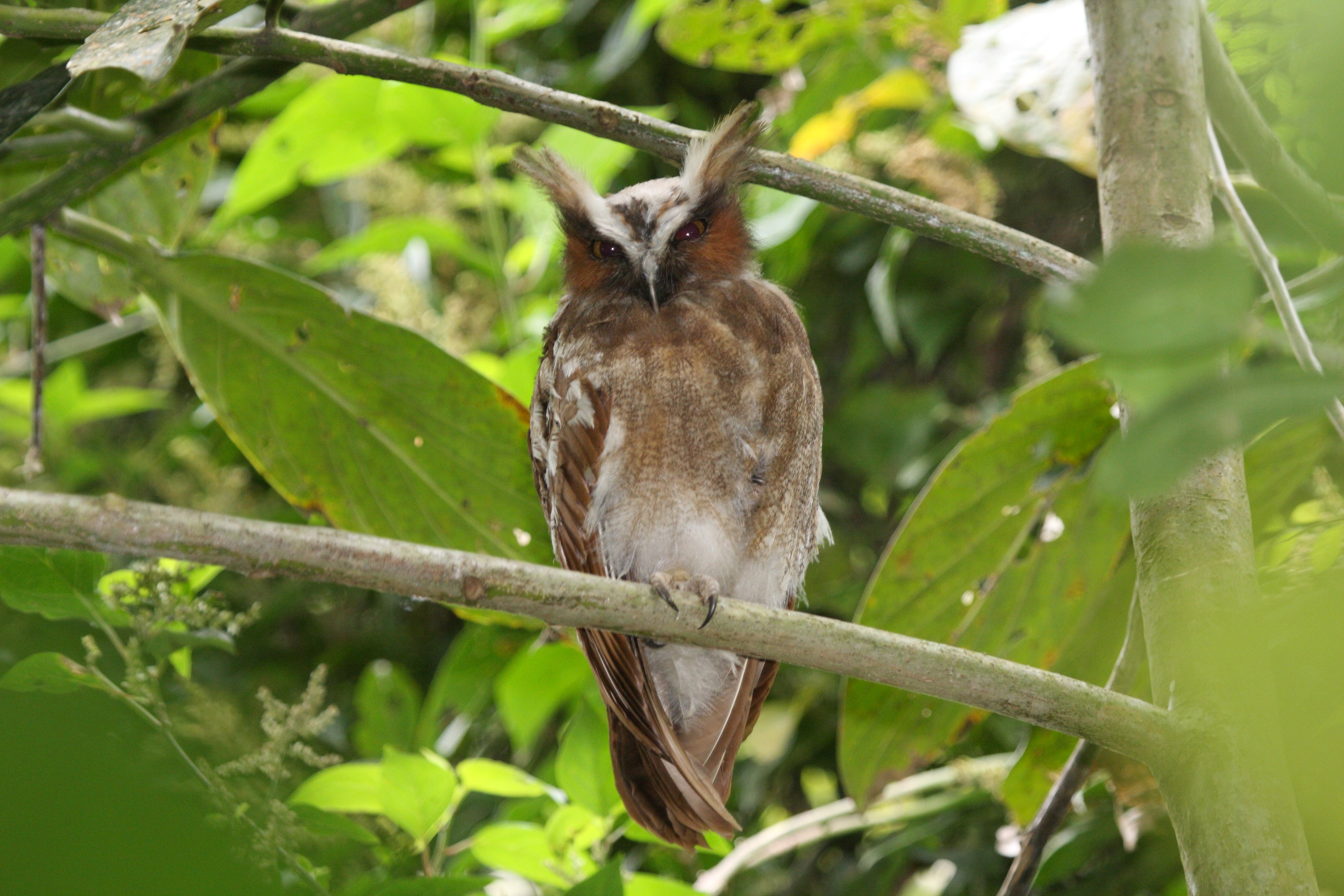
- In Panama

Conservation status
- Least Concern (IUCN 3.1)
- CITES Appendix II

Scientific classification
- Kingdom: Animalia
- Phylum: Chordata
- Class: Aves
- Order: Strigiformes
- Family: Strigidae
- Genus: Lophostrix; Lesson, 1836
- Species: L. cristata

Binomial name
- Lophostrix cristata (Daudin, 1800)

= Crested owl =

Species of owl

The crested owl (Lophostrix cristata) is a species of owl in the family Strigidae. It is the only species (monotypic) in the genus Lophostrix. It is a resident bird and occurs in Central America and northern South America. It is a medium-sized owl, easily recognizable with its very long whitish ear tufts and otherwise darker appearance. It inhabits lowland rainforests and prefers old growth in proximity with water. The crested owl is a strictly nocturnal species, but very little is known about its behaviour.

== Taxonomy ==
The genus of the crested owl is in the family Strigidae as well as the subfamily Striginae and is traditionally recognized as a part of the tribe Strigini along with Strix, Jubula and Pulsatrix. However, recent analysis suggest that Lophostrix could form its own tribe, Pulsatrigini, with Pulsatrix.

There are three recognized subspecies:

- Lophostrix cristata cristata (Daudin, 1800)
- Lophostrix cristata wedeli (Griscom, 1932)
- Lophostrix cristata stricklandi (Sclater & Salvin, 1859)

It has been suggested that Lophostrix cristata stricklandi could be specifically distinct from Lophostrix cristata on the basis that it has a grey morph, a shorter song and strictly yellow eyes.

== Description ==
The crested owl is a medium-sized owl with a total length ranging from 38 to 43 cm and weighs 425 to 620 grams. It is distinctively recognized with its very long white or buff colored ear tufts and its prominent whitish eyestripe that extends into the ear tufts. The Iris varies from yellow to brown mottled with rufous. The bill is generally yellow or darker and its toes are a pale grey-brown colour.

The mesoptile (down feathers) of juveniles is whitish. Their facial disk is dark, and the ear tufts are short. The flight and tail feathers are similar to adults.

=== Colour morphs ===
The adult form has two colour morphs: a dark and a pale morph. A third greyish morph has been described, but it is restricted to the subspecies Lophostrix cristata stricklandi

The dark morph has an overall chocolate-brown colour, with the Crown, facial disk and upper breast in the same deep chocolate colour. The wing coverts and primaries are dotted with white and all flight feathers are barred light and dark. The tail feathers are chocolate brown with some darker mottling and the throat is pale buff.

The light morph individuals have a rufous-brown overall colour and the upper breast has a dark brown collar.

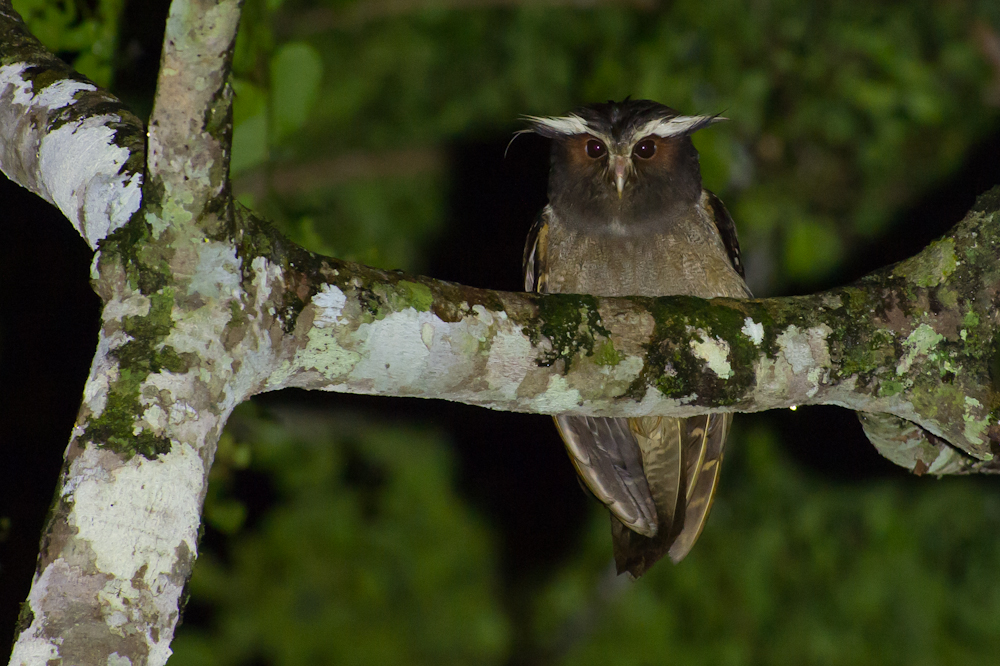

== Distribution and habitat ==
The crested owl is a resident bird throughout its Central and South American range.

=== Distribution ===
The crested owl is found in Central America and northern South America, where it occurs in Belize, Bolivia, Brazil, Colombia, Costa Rica, Ecuador, El Salvador, French Guiana, Guatemala, Guyana, Honduras, Mexico, Nicaragua, Panama, Peru, Suriname, and Venezuela. It is found in the Amazon Basin except in the north-west basin region with western Guyana, Venezuela, and central-eastern Colombia.

=== Habitat ===
The crested owl natural habitats are subtropical or tropical moist lowland forest and subtropical or tropical moist montane forest. They live up to 1000m in altitude, and are found in higher abundance where there is undergrowth and the presence of snags. Crested owls also prefer proximity with water. They favor old growth, however they will also occur in undisturbed secondary growth forest. More specifically, they are most abundant in old floodplain forest and are least abundant in primary seasonally flooded swamp forest.

In Mexico, they are found in tropical evergreen and semi-deciduous forests, riparian areas, clearings and foothills.

== Behaviour ==
As with most owls, this species is strictly nocturnal. They generally roost with their pair-member during the day in dense bushes, along forested streams or rivers and like to perch 3 to 10 meters above ground. When the crested owl is disturbed while roosting, it becomes slim and erects its ear tufts high.

=== Breeding ===
The crested owl breeds during the dry or early wet season and apparently nest in naturally occurring holes of mature trees.

=== Diet ===
This owl feeds mainly on large insects, and they are thought to feed on small vertebrates as well. Bats are estimated to represent only 5% of the owl's diet, but they are known to be opportunistic predators. Recent observations described two crested owl preying on Seba's short tailed bat in mist nets.

=== Vocalization ===
The characteristic call of the crested owl is usually given when they are perched high in the canopy. The call is low but far carrying Gooooorrr or Broorrr. The song resembles a frog-like croak and can be mistaken by the call of the Bare-Throated Tiger Heron. The song begins with a stuttering rattle k-k-kkkk, which accelerates to a deep, rough and guttural krrrrrao. At a distance the first introductory notes are inaudible. The song is repeated at intervals of a few seconds.

Crested owls tend to be more vocal towards the summer solstice.

== Conservation ==
According to the IUCN red list of threatened species, the crested owl is of least concern as of 2012, with populations classified as stable. Even though the populations are decreasing, the species has an extremely large range and is estimated to have a population of over 10,000 mature individuals. It is suspected to lose 18-21% of suitable habitat within its range over the next 17 years, thus suspected to decline by 25% over three generations. This owl is still fairly common in undisturbed primary forests of the amazon, but could become locally endangered where deforestation takes place.
