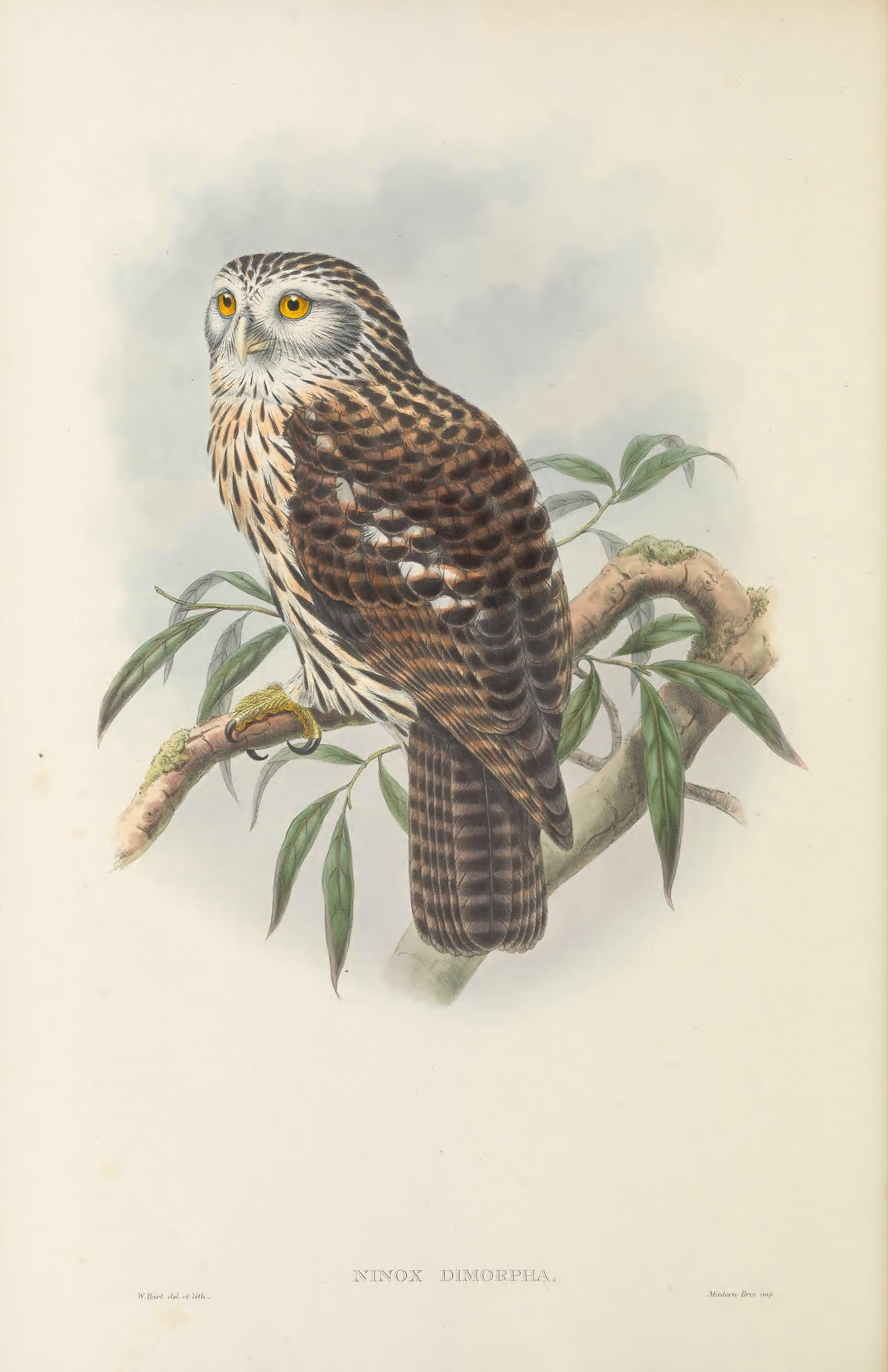

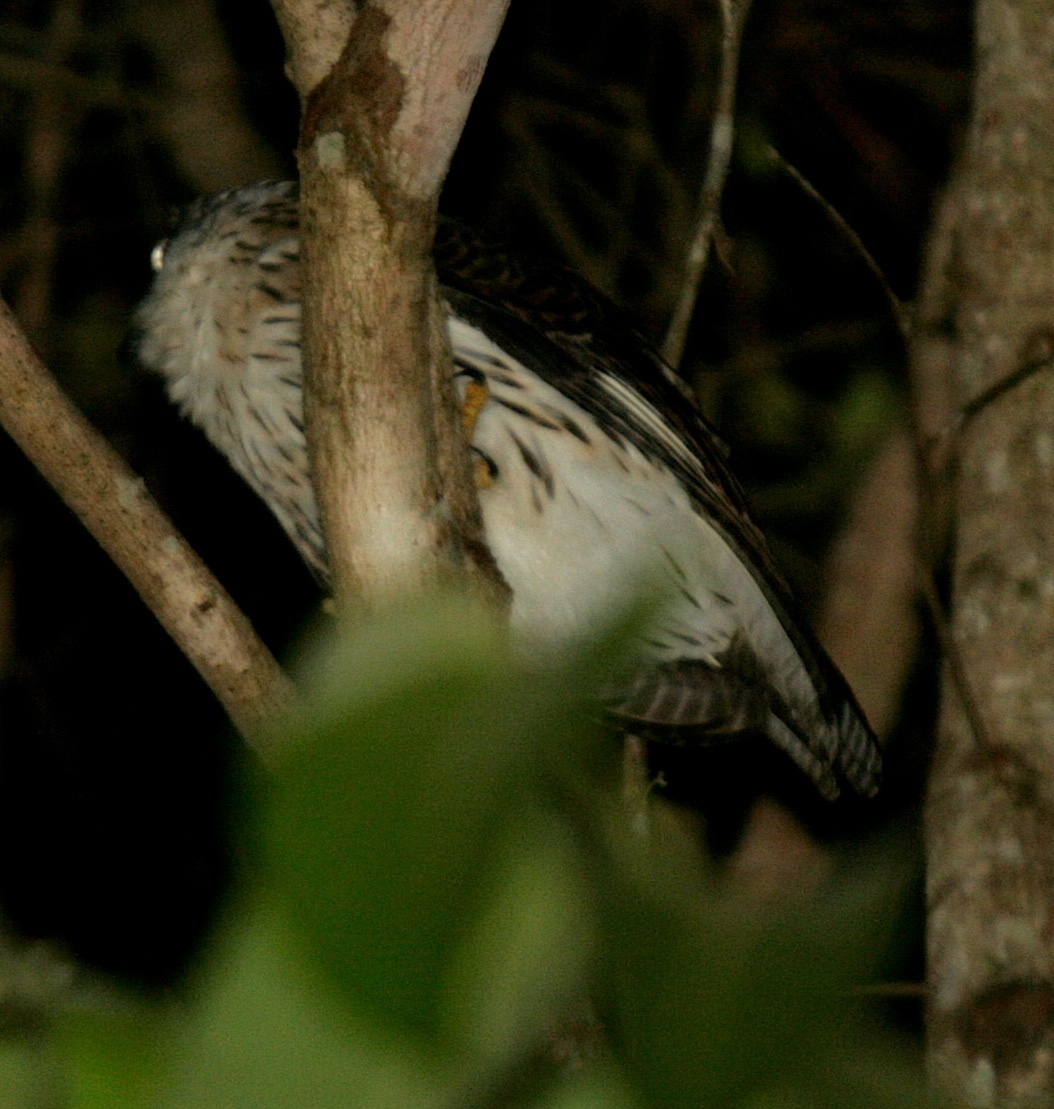

Conservation status
- Least Concern (IUCN 3.1)
- CITES Appendix II

Scientific classification
- Kingdom: Animalia
- Phylum: Chordata
- Class: Aves
- Order: Strigiformes
- Family: Strigidae
- Genus: Uroglaux; Mayr, 1937
- Species: U. dimorpha

Binomial name
- Uroglaux dimorpha (Salvadori, 1874)

= Papuan hawk-owl =

Species of owl

The Papuan hawk owl (Uroglaux dimorpha), sometimes also Papuan boobook (not to be confused with Ninox theomacha), is a medium-sized, sleek owl with a proportionately small head, long tail, and short, rounded wings. Its white facial disk is small and indistinct, with black streaks, and white eyebrows. It has buff-colored upperparts and barred black and brown underparts. Its eyes are bright yellow, and it has a gray to black bill. The male is larger than the female, which is unusual among owls.

Though generally found in lowland rainforest or gallery forest in lowland savanna, the Papuan hawk-owl is occasionally found at elevations of up to 1,500 m (4,900 ft) above sea level. It is probably a resident species in its restricted range, New Guinea.

Not much is known about the status of this species, as insufficient data exist to quantify its population. It is rarely seen, and may be threatened due to deforestation.
