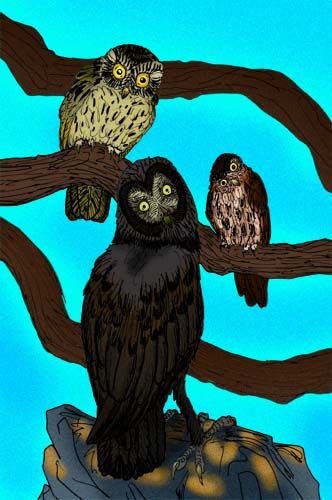
- Comparison of O. brea (center), and other extinct owls

Scientific classification
- Kingdom: Animalia
- Phylum: Chordata
- Class: Aves
- Order: Strigiformes
- Family: Strigidae
- Genus: †Oraristrix; Campbell & Bocheński, 2010
- Species: †O. brea

Binomial name
- †Oraristrix brea (Howard, 1933)

Synonyms
- Strix brea Howard, 1933

= Oraristrix =

Oraristrix Temporal range: Pleistocene

Extinct genus of birds

Oraristrix brea, commonly known as the La Brea owl, is an extinct species of owl reported from the Upper Pleistocene asphalt deposits at the La Brea Tar Pits in Los Angeles, California. It was first described by Hildegarde Howard in 1933 as Strix brea and was subsequently assigned to the separate genus Oraristrix by Campbell and Bocheński in 2010. The species has also been recorded from Upper Pleistocene asphalt deposits of Carpinteria, California. Its relatively long legs in proportion to its wingspan suggest that O. brea was more terrestrial in its habits than modern North American species of Bubo and Strix.

== See also ==
- Glaucidium kurochkini, a pygmy owl also known from the La Brea Tar Pits
- Asphaltoglaux, another owl from the La Brea Tar Pits, this one being more closely related to owls of the genus Aegolius
