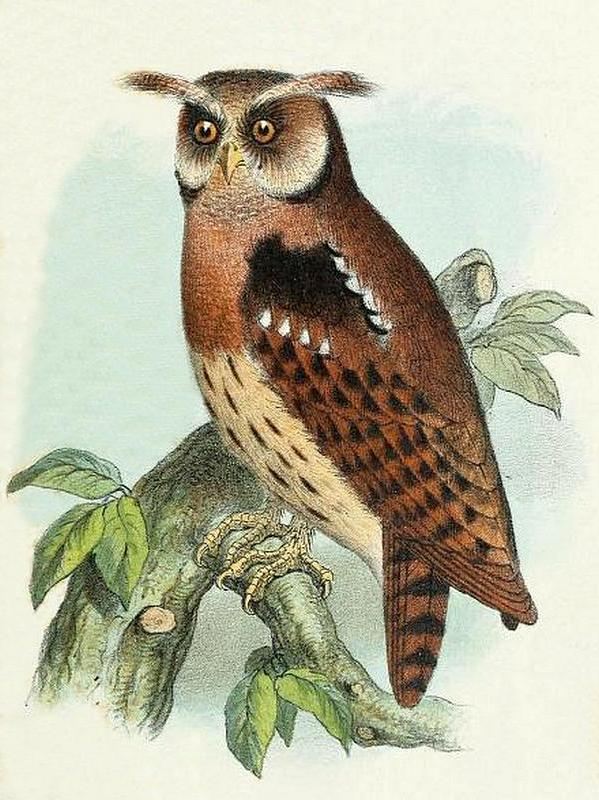

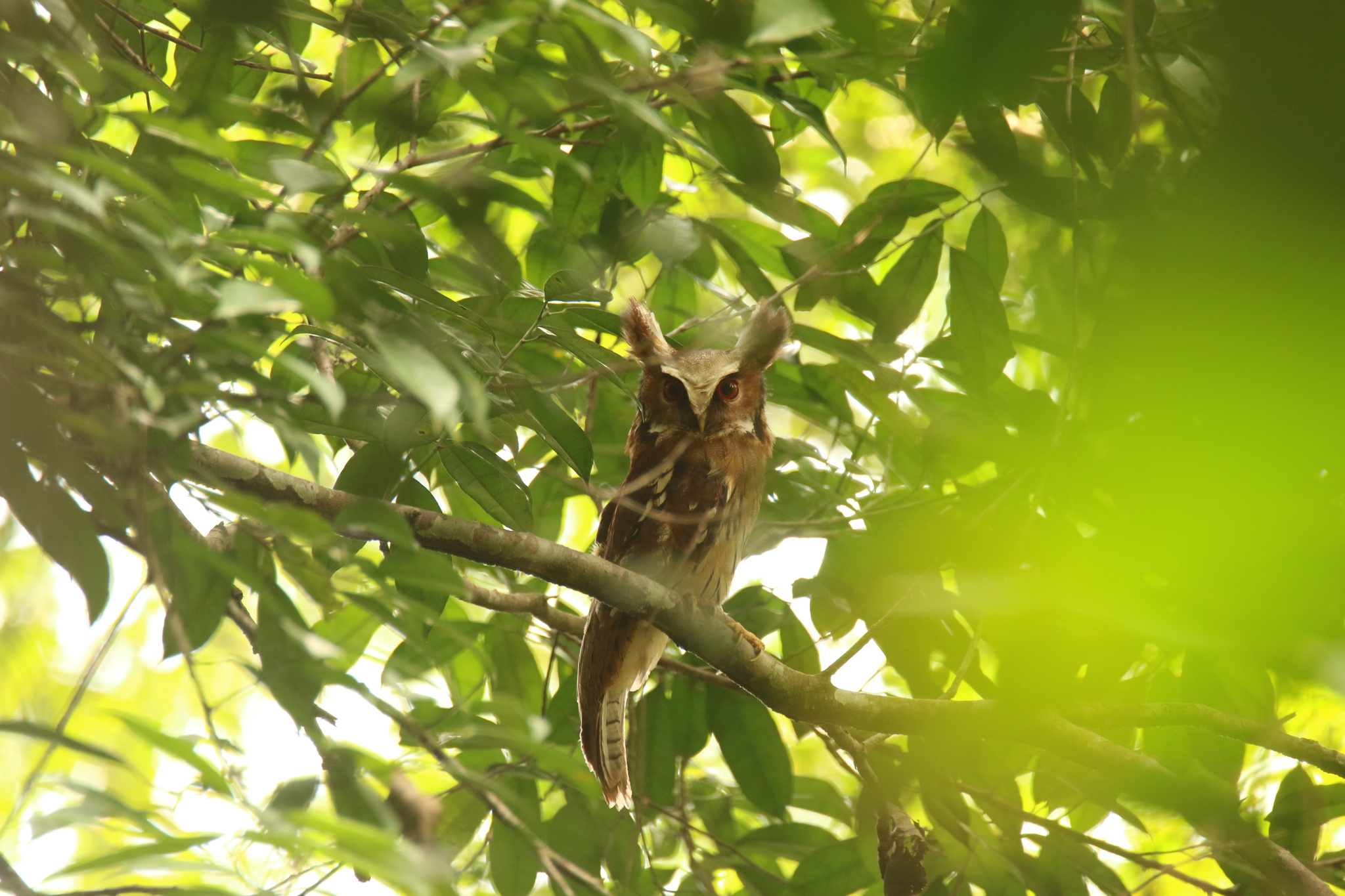

Conservation status
- Least Concern (IUCN 3.1)

Scientific classification
- Kingdom: Animalia
- Phylum: Chordata
- Class: Aves
- Order: Strigiformes
- Family: Strigidae
- Genus: Jubula; Bates, 1929
- Species: J. lettii

Binomial name
- Jubula lettii (Büttikofer, 1889)

= Maned owl =

Species of owl

The maned owl (Jubula lettii) or the Akun scops owl, is a species of owl in the family Strigidae that is endemic to Africa. It is the only species in genus Jubula.

== Description ==
The maned owl gets its name from the long, floppy, white-tipped feathers on its crown and ear tufts which seem to form a mane. Otherwise it is a medium-sized, large-headed, rufous owl. The upperparts are deep chestnut with narrow, wavy dark bars, which are darker on the lesser wing coverts and on the head, so that they contrast with the white forehead and tips to the ear-tufts. The facial disk is rufous with a broad blackish rim and a white throat. The upper breast is rufous with white bars, the lower breast and belly are buff with dark streaks while the vent and legs are pale buff. The flight feathers and the tail have broad dark bars on a rufous background. The bill is yellow, the cere greenish-yellow and the eyes, legs and feet are yellow. The body length is 25 cm (9.8 in).

== Distribution and habitat ==
The maned owl is known only from the lowland, tropical rainforest of west Africa and has a patchy distribution from Liberia in the west through to the Democratic Republic of Congo. The patchiness of its distribution is shown by the countries it has been recorded in which are Liberia, Ivory Coast, Ghana, Cameroon, Equatorial Guinea, Gabon, Congo and the Democratic Republic of Congo.

The maned owl seems to prefer closed canopy evergreen rainforest, especially areas with dense creepers, it is not found in semi-evergreen open-canopy forest, and there are no records away from dense forest or forest clearings.

== Behaviour ==
The maned owl is not well known. It is nocturnal, roosting by day in dense creepers as close to the ground as 2 m (6.6 ft), emerging out onto an open perch at dusk. Their diet is not well understood, but small and weak feet and claws suggest that insects such as grasshoppers and beetles form the largest part of its diet. Green plant material has been found in the stomach contents of a young owl.

As with its diet little is known of its breeding behaviour and the call is unrecorded. In the Democratic Republic of the Congo a nest was observed and the results suggest that this species lays three or four eggs between March and May. The nest is in a tree cavity or an old stick nest of another animal is reused. Juveniles have been recorded in late December and January in Cameroon and Gabon, and a pair of adults with full-grown young were observed in Liberia in late February.
