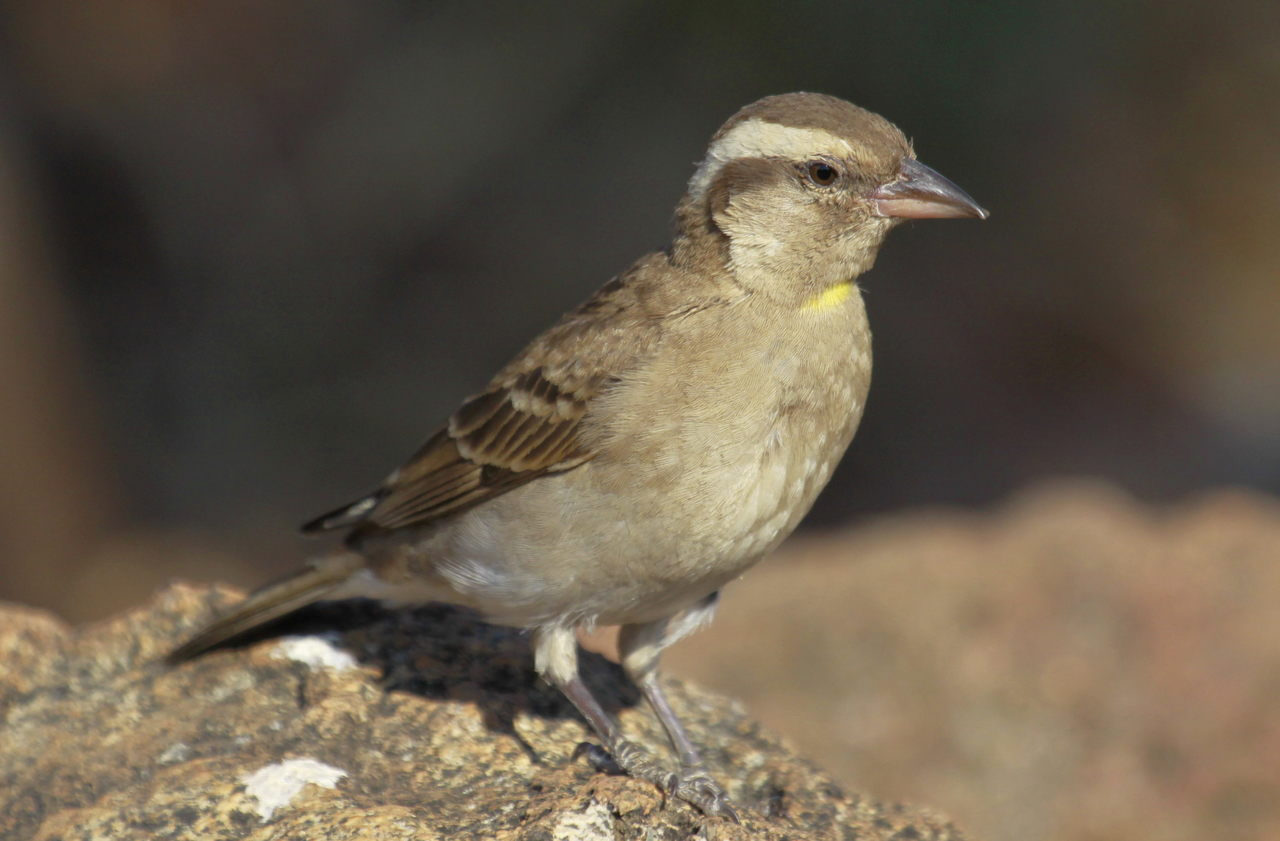

Conservation status
- Least Concern (IUCN 3.1)

Scientific classification
- Kingdom: Animalia
- Phylum: Chordata
- Class: Aves
- Order: Passeriformes
- Family: Passeridae
- Genus: Gymnoris
- Species: G. superciliaris

Binomial name
- Gymnoris superciliaris Blyth, 1845

Synonyms
- Petronia superciliaris

= Yellow-throated bush sparrow =

Species of bird

The yellow-throated bush sparrow (Gymnoris superciliaris), also known as the yellow-throated petronia, is a species of bird in the sparrow family Passeridae. It is found in south-central and southern Africa in its natural habitats of subtropical or tropical dry forests, dry savanna, and subtropical or tropical dry shrubland.
