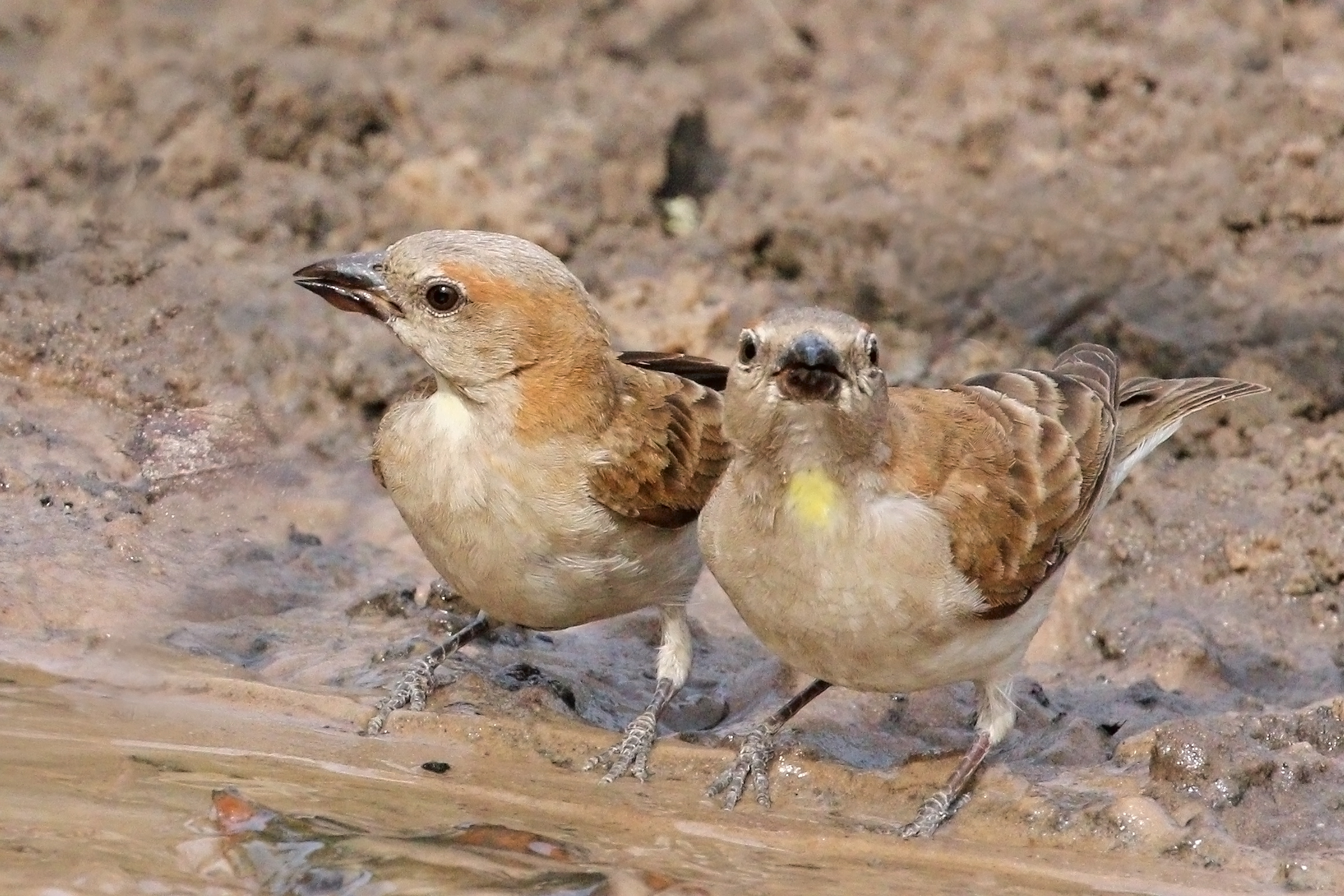

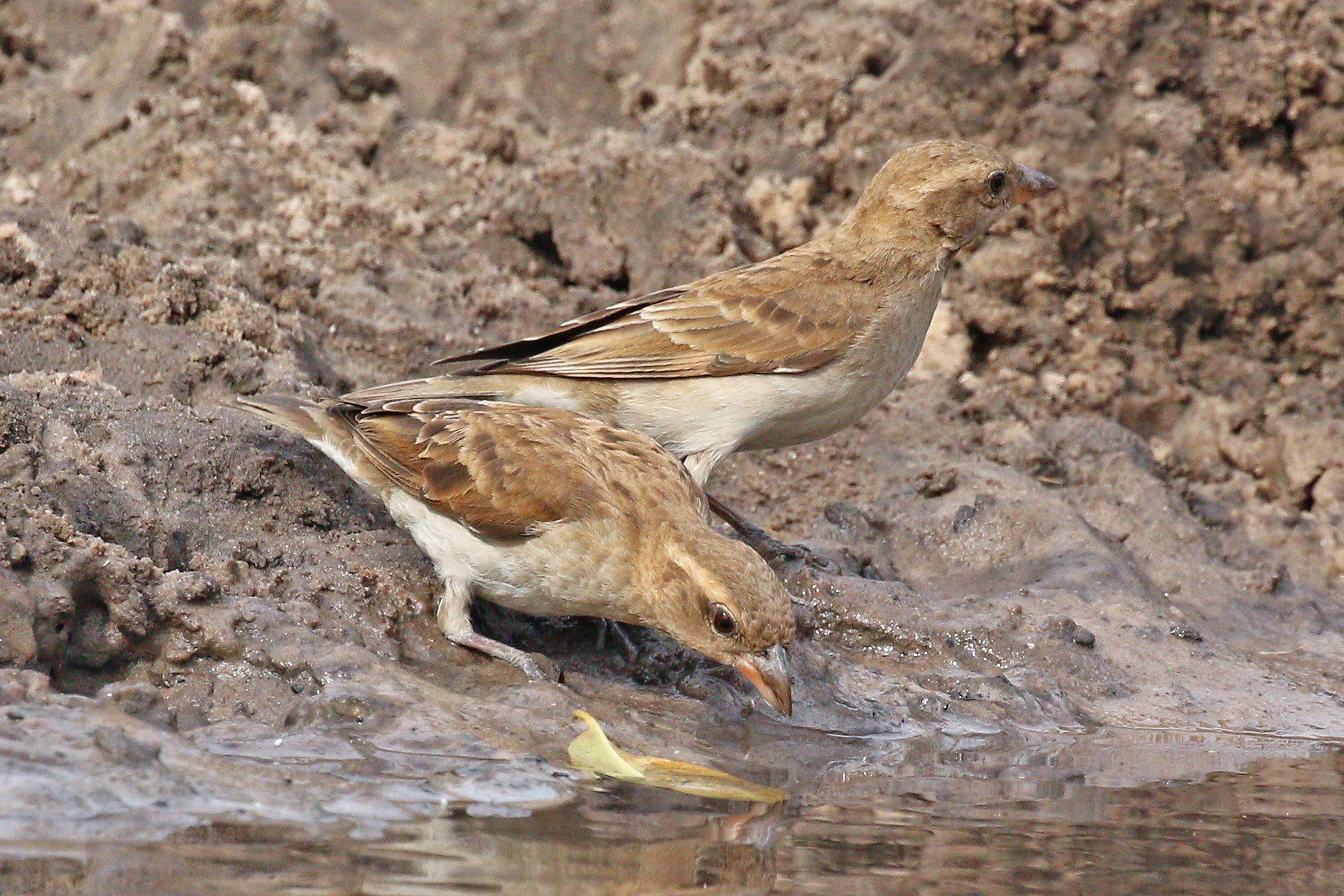
- Male (top image) and females in Senegal (below)

Conservation status
- Least Concern (IUCN 3.1)

Scientific classification
- Kingdom: Animalia
- Phylum: Chordata
- Class: Aves
- Order: Passeriformes
- Family: Passeridae
- Genus: Gymnoris
- Species: G. dentata

Binomial name
- Gymnoris dentata (Sundevall, 1850)

Synonyms
- Gymnornis dentata; Petronia dentata; Xanthodira dentata

= Sahel bush sparrow =

Species of bird

The Sahel bush sparrow (Gymnoris dentata) or bush petronia, is a species of bird in the family Passeridae. It is found in Africa from Mauritania to Guinea and east to Eritrea and the south-western Arabian Peninsula in its natural habitats of dry savanna and subtropical or tropical dry shrubland.

== Description ==
The Sahel bush sparrow is a small bird with a large, conical beak and a short tail. It grows to a length of about 13 cm (5 in). The male has a grey crown, a wide but ill-defined reddish-brown supercilium and greyish-brown face and throat, surrounding the creamy-white bib. The male's beak is black during the breeding season but horn-coloured during the rest of the year. The plumage on the upper parts and tail is mainly brown, with no white on the tail. The upper throat has an ill-defined yellowish spot and the breast is creamy-buff, becoming whiter on the belly. The female is similar, but has a better-defined white supercilium, brownish rather than grey crown and face, horn-coloured beak all year round and two white wing bars. The juvenile is similar to the female.

== Distribution and habitat ==
This bush sparrow is found in suitable habitat in a broad belt across the Sahel region of Africa, its range extending from Senegal to Eritrea and Yemen. Its habitat is typically semi-arid savannah with scattered trees and cultivated clearings near settlements, at altitudes up to about 1,700 m (5,600 ft).

== Status ==
This species has an extremely wide range and is described as common in some parts of its range. The population seems to be steady and no specific threats have been identified, so the International Union for Conservation of Nature has assessed its conservation status as being of "least concern".
