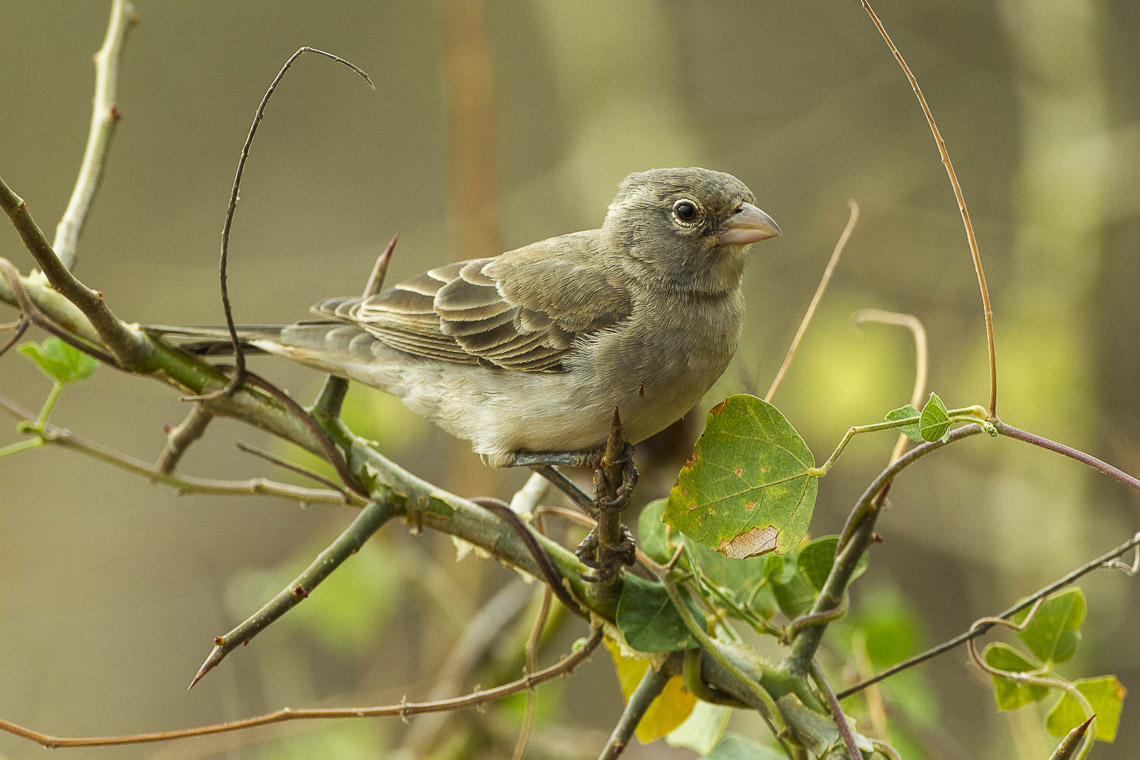

Conservation status
- Least Concern (IUCN 3.1)

Scientific classification
- Kingdom: Animalia
- Phylum: Chordata
- Class: Aves
- Order: Passeriformes
- Family: Passeridae
- Genus: Gymnoris
- Species: G. pyrgita

Binomial name
- Gymnoris pyrgita (Heuglin, 1862)

Synonyms
- Petronia pyrgita

= Yellow-spotted bush sparrow =

Species of bird

The yellow-spotted bush sparrow or yellow-spotted petronia (Gymnoris pyrgita) is a species of bird in the sparrow family, Passeridae.

It is common throughout the Sahel and the Horn of Africa. Its natural habitats are dry savannah and subtropical or tropical dry lowland grassland.
