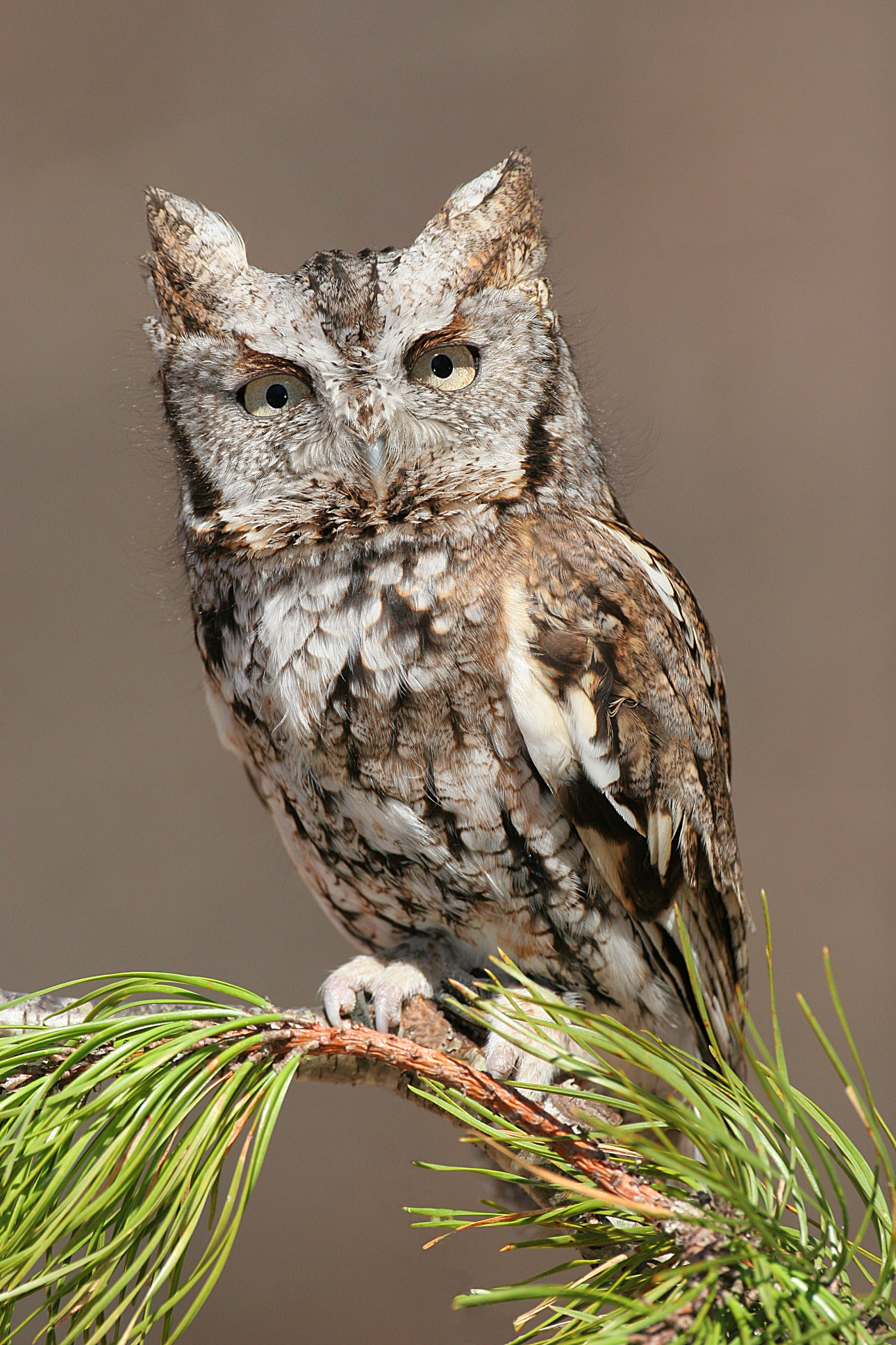
- Eastern screech owl (Megascops asio)

Scientific classification
- Kingdom: Animalia
- Phylum: Chordata
- Class: Aves
- Order: Strigiformes
- Family: Strigidae; Leach, 1819

Type genus
- Strix Linnaeus, 1758

Genera
- some 25, see text

Synonyms
- Striginae sensu Sibley & Ahlquist

Audio
- Strix aluco hooting in Britain

= Strigidae =

Strigidae Temporal range: Early Eocene to present

Family of birds

The true owls or typical owls (family Strigidae) are one of the two generally accepted families of owls, the other being the barn owls and bay owls (Tytonidae). This large family comprises roughly 230 living or recently extinct species in 23 genera. The Strigidae owls have a cosmopolitan distribution and are found on every continent except Antarctica.

== Morphology ==
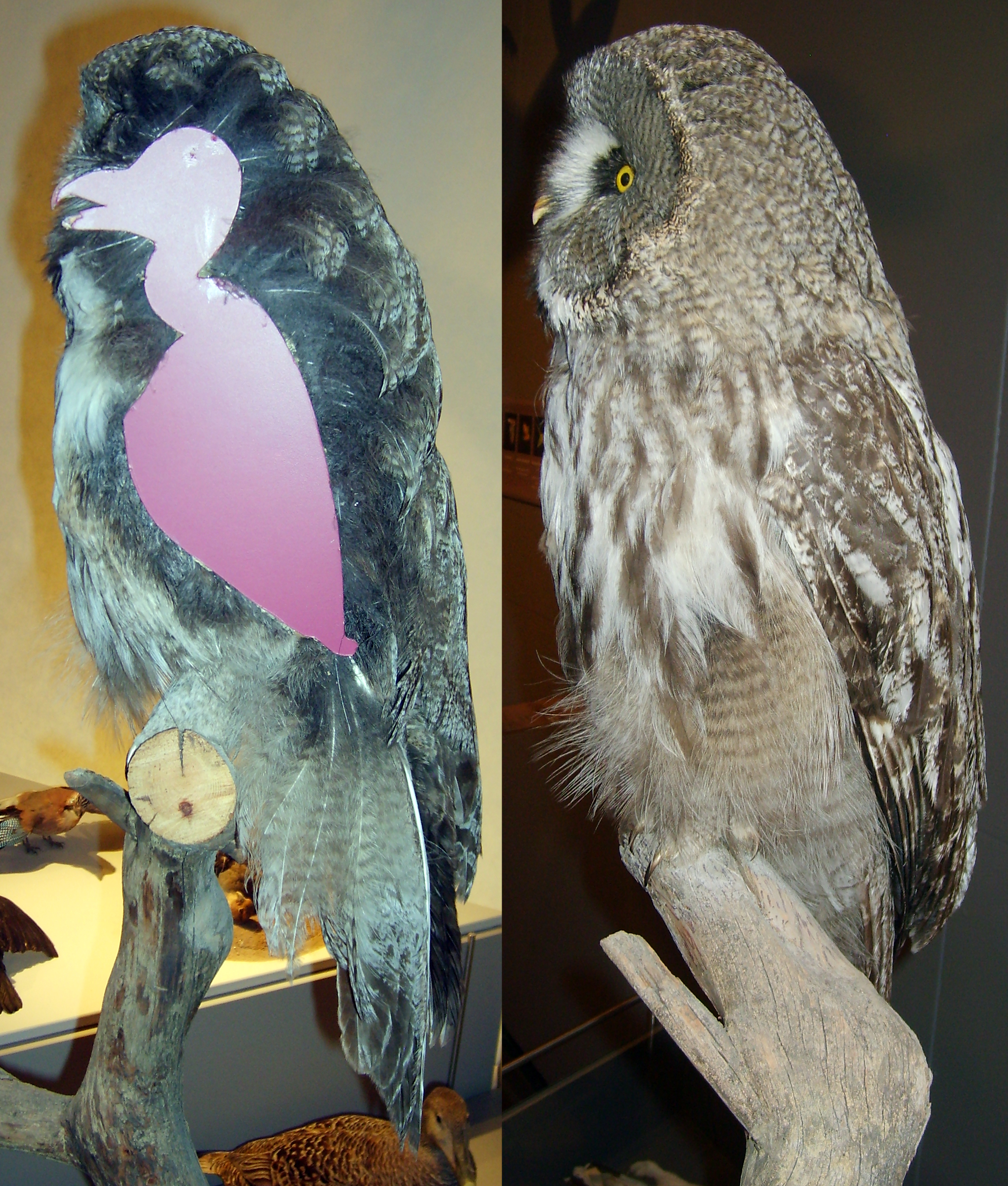
Cross sectioned great grey owl specimen showing the extent of the body plumage, Zoological Museum, Copenhagen

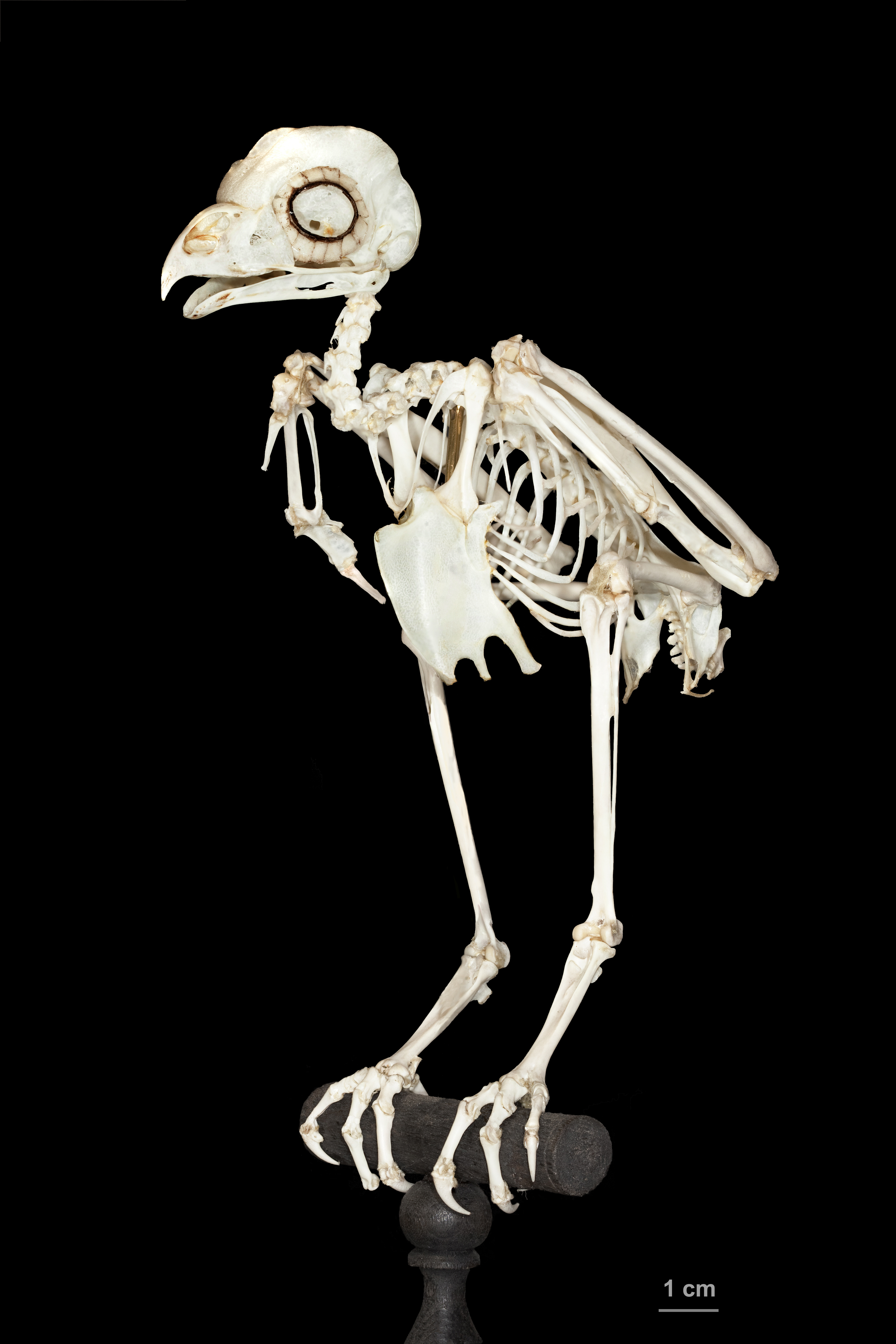
Skeleton of a Strigidae owl

Typical owls (hereafter referred to simply as owls) generally share an extremely similar body plan, though they vary greatly in size, with the smallest species, the elf owl, being a hundredth the size of the largest, the Eurasian eagle-owl and Blakiston's fish owl. They tend to have large heads, short tails, cryptic plumage, and round facial discs around the eyes. The family is generally arboreal (with a few exceptions like the burrowing owl) and obtain their food on the wing. The wings are large, broad, rounded, and long. As is the case with most birds of prey, in many owl species females are larger than males.

Because of their nocturnal habits, they tend not to exhibit sexual dimorphism in their plumage. Specialized feathers and wing shape suppress the noise produced by flying, both taking off, flapping and gliding. This silent flight allows owls to hunt without being heard by their prey. Owls possess three physical attributes that are thought to contribute to their silent flight capability. First, on the leading edge of the wing, there is a comb of stiff feathers. Second, the trailing edge of the wing contains a flexible fringe. Finally, owls have downy material distributed on the tops of their wings that creates a compliant but rough surface (similar to that of a soft carpet). All these factors result in significant aerodynamic noise reductions. The toes and tarsi are feathered in some species, and more so in species at higher latitudes. Numerous species of owls in the genus Glaucidium and the northern hawk-owl have eye patches on the backs of their heads, apparently to convince other birds they are being watched at all times. Numerous nocturnal species have ear-tufts, feathers on the sides of the head that are thought to have a camouflage function, breaking up the outline of a roosting bird. The feathers of the facial disc are arranged in order to increase sound delivered to the ears. Hearing in owls is highly sensitive and the ears are asymmetrical allowing the owl to localise a sound in multiple directions. Owls can pinpoint the position of prey, such as a squeaking mouse, by computing when the sound from the object reaches the owl's ears. If the sound reaches the left ear first, the mouse must be to the left of the owl. The owl's brain will then direct the head to directly face the mouse. In addition to hearing, owls have massive eyes relative to their body size. Contrary to popular belief, however, owls cannot see well in extreme dark and are able to see well in the day.

Owls are also able to rotate their heads by as much as 270 degrees in either direction without damaging the blood vessels in their necks and heads, and without disrupting blood flow to their brains. Researchers have found four major biological adaptations that allow for this unique capability. First, in the neck there is a major artery, called the vertebral artery, that feeds the brain. This artery passes through bony holes in the vertebra. These bony holes are ten times larger in diameter than the artery that passes through them (extra space in the transverse foramina) which creates air pockets that allow for more movement of the artery when twisted. Twelve of the fourteen cervical vertebrae in the owl's neck have this adaptation. This vertebral artery also enters the neck higher up than it does in other birds. Instead of going in at the 14th cervical vertebrae, it enters in at the 12th cervical vertebrae. Finally, the small vessel connection between the carotid and the vertebral arteries allow the exchanging of blood between two blood vessels. These cross connections allow for uninterrupted blood flow to the brain. This means that even if one route is blocked during extreme head rotations, another route can continue blood circulation to the brain.

Several owl species also have fluorescent pigments called porphyrins under their wings. A large group of pigments defined by nitrogen-containing pyrole rings, including chlorophyll and heme (in animal blood), make up the porphyrins. Other bird species will use porphyrins to pigment eggshells in the oviduct. Owl species, however, use porphyrins as a pigment in their plumage. Porphyrins are most prevalent in new feathers and are easily destroyed by sunlight. Porphyrin pigments in feathers fluoresce under UV light, allowing biologists to more accurately classify the age of owls. The relative ages of the feathers are differentiated by the intensity of fluorescence that they emit when the primaries and secondaries are exposed to black light. This method helps to detect the subtle differences between third and fourth generation feathers, whereas looking at wear and color makes age determination difficult.

== Niche competition ==
It has been noted that there is some competition for niche space between the spotted owl and the barred owl (both of which are true owls). This competition is related to deforestation, and therefore a reduction in niche quantity and quality. This deforestation is more specifically the result of overlogging and forest fires. These two species of owl are known to traditionally live in mature forests of old and tall trees, which are now mostly limited to public lands. As niche overlap is occurring in these two families, there is a concern with the barred owls encroaching on the spotted owl's North American habitats, causing a decline of the spotted owl. As noted above, these species prefer mature forests which, due to deforestation, are at limited supply and take a long time to reestablish after deforestation has occurred. Because the northern spotted owl shares its territories and competes with other species, it is declining at a more rapid pace. This invasion by barred owls occurred about 50 years ago in the Pacific Northwest, and despite their low numbers, they are considered an invasive species because of the harm done to native spotted owls. In this competition for resources, hunting locations and general niches, the barred owl is pushing the spotted owl to local extinction. It is thought that the rapid decrease in population size of spotted owls will cause a trophic cascade, since the spotted owls help provide a healthy ecosystem.

== Behaviour ==
Owls are generally nocturnal and/or crepuscular and spend much of the day roosting. They are often misperceived as 'tame' since they allow humans to approach quite closely before taking flight, but in reality they are attempting to avoid detection through stillness. Their cryptic plumage and the inconspicuous locations they adopt are an effort to avoid predators and mobbing by small birds.

== Communication ==
Owls, such as the eagle-owl, will use visual signaling in intraspecific communication (communication within the species), both in territorial habits and parent-offspring interactions. Some researchers believe owls can employ various visual signals in other situations involving intraspecific interaction. Experimental evidence suggests that owl feces and the remains of prey can act as visual signals. This new type of signaling behavior could potentially indicate the owls' current reproductive state to intruders, including other territorial owls or non-breeding floaters. Feces are an ideal material for marking due to its minimal energetic costs, and can also continue to indicate territorial boundaries even when occupied in activities other than territorial defense. Preliminary evidence also suggests that owls will use feces and the feathers of their prey to signal their breeding status to members within the same species.

== Migration ==
Some species of owl are migratory. One such species, the northern saw-whet owl, migrates south even when food and resources are ample in the north.

== Habitat, climate and seasonal changes ==
Some owls have a higher survival rate and are more likely to reproduce in a habitat that contains a mixture of old growth forests and other vegetation types. Old growth forests provide ample dark areas for owls to hide from predators Like many organisms, spotted owls rely on forest fires to create their habitat and provide areas for foraging. Unfortunately, climate change and intentional fire suppression have altered natural fire habits. Owls avoid badly burned areas but they benefit from the mosaics of heterogeneous habitats created by fires. This is not to say that all fires are good for owls. Owls only thrive when fires are not of high severity and not large stand-replacing (high-severity fires that burn most of the vegetation) which create large canopy gaps that are not adequate for owls.

== Parasites ==
Avian malaria or Plasmodium relictum affects owls and specifically, 44% of northern and Californian spotted owls harbor 17 strains of the parasite. As mentioned in the niche competition section above, spotted owls and barred owls are in competition so their niche overlap may be resulting in the plasmodium parasite having more hosts in a concentrated area but this is not certain.

== Predators ==
The main predators of owls are other species of owls. An example of this occurs with the northern saw-whet owl that lives in the northern U.S. and lives low to the ground in brushy areas typically of cedar forests. These owls eat mice, and perch in trees at eye level. Their main predators are barred owls and great horned owls.

== Systematics ==
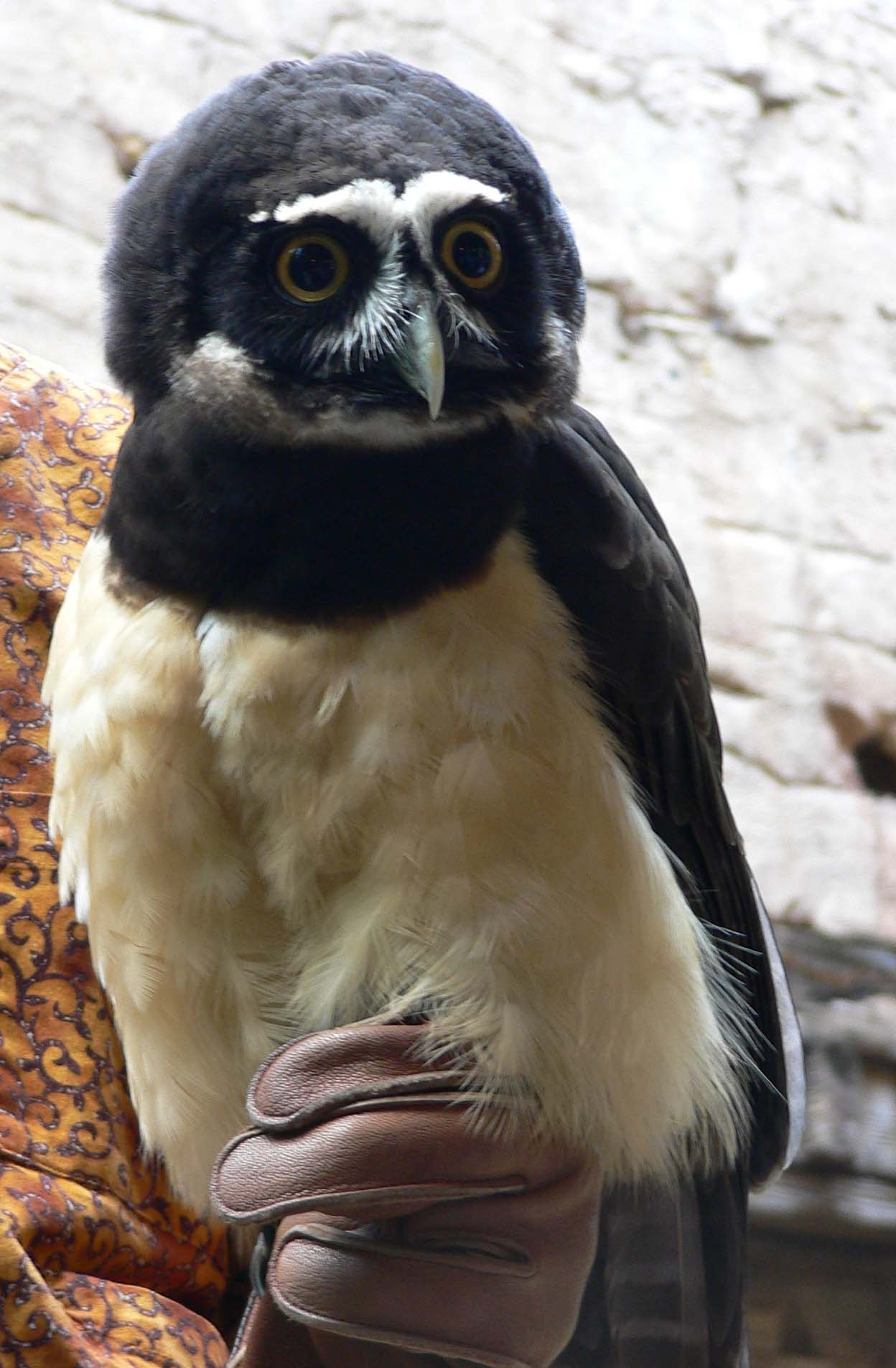
Spectacled owl (Pulsatrix perspicillata)

The family Strigidae was introduced by the English zoologist William Elford Leach in a guide to the contents of the British Museum published in 1819.

A molecular phylogenetic study of the owls by Jessie Salter and collaborators published in 2020 found that the family Strigidae was divided into two sister clades and some of the traditional genera were paraphyletic. The placement of three monotypic genera remained uncertain due to the degraded nature of the available DNA. Based on these results Frank Gill, Pamela Rasmussen and David Donsker updated the online list of world birds that they maintain on behalf of the International Ornithological Committee (IOC).

The cladogram below is based on the results of the study by Salter and collaborators published in 2020. The subfamilies are those defined by Edward Dickinson and James Van Remsen Jr. in 2013. A genetic study published in 2021 suggested that the genus Scotopelia may be embedded within Ketupa.

Blakiston's fish owl (Ketupa blakistoni) the largest species of owl

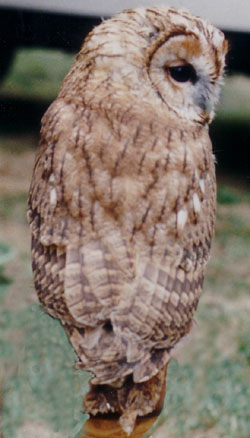
Tawny owl (Strix aluco)

- Strigidae
  - - - Ieraglaucinae
        - Ninox – 37 species: hawk-owls and boobooks
        - Uroglaux – Papuan hawk-owl (position uncertain)
      - Surniinae
        - - - Aegolius – 5 species
            - - Athene – 9 species
              - - Glaucidium – 26 species: pygmy owls
                - Surnia – northern hawk-owl
          - - Margarobyas – bare-legged owl (position uncertain)
            - - Taenioptynx – 2 species
              - - Micrathene – elf owl
                - Xenoglaux – long-whiskered owlet
    - Striginae
      - Otus – 58 species: scops owls
      - - - Asio – 9 species in total
          - Ptilopsis – 2 species
        - - - Jubula – maned owl (position uncertain)
            - - Bubo – 10 species: eagle-owls, horned-owls and snowy owl
              - - Ketupa – 12 species: fish owls and eagle-owls
                - Scotopelia – 3 species: fishing owls
          - - - - Megascops – 22 species: screech owls
                - - Gymnasio – Puerto Rican owl
                  - Psiloscops – flammulated owl
              - - Strix – 21 species: earless owls
                - - Lophostrix – crested owl
                  - Pulsatrix – 3 species

The 228 extant or recently extinct species are assigned to 23 genera:

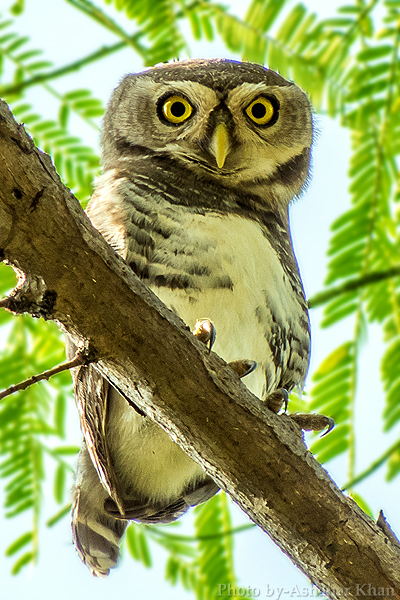
The forest owlet (Athene blewiti), one of the critically endangered owls found in the Central Indian Forest

- Genus Uroglaux – Papuan hawk-owl
- Genus Ninox – Australasian hawk-owls, 37 species of which one is recently extinct
- Genus Margarobyas – bare-legged owl or Cuban screech-owl
- Genus Taenioptynx – two species previous placed in Glaucidium
- Genus Micrathene – elf owl
- Genus Xenoglaux – long-whiskered owlet
- Genus Aegolius – saw-whet owls, five species of which one is recently extinct
- Genus Athene – nine species
- Genus Surnia – northern hawk-owl
- Genus Glaucidium – pygmy owls, 26 species
- Genus Otus – scops owls, 58 species including three extinct species formerly placed in Mascarenotus
- Genus Ptilopsis – white-faced owls, two species
- Genus Asio – eared owls, nine species
- Genus Jubula – maned owl
- Genus Bubo – eagle-owls, horned-owls and snowy owl, 10 species
- Genus Scotopelia – fishing owls, three species
- Genus Ketupa – fish owls and eagle-owls, 12 species (including 9 species previously placed in Bubo)
- Genus Psiloscops – flammulated owl
- Genus Gymnasio – Puerto Rican owl
- Genus Megascops – screech-owls, 22 species
- Genus Pulsatrix – spectacled owls, three species
- Genus Lophostrix – crested owl
- Genus Strix – earless owls, 21 species, including four previously placed in Ciccaba

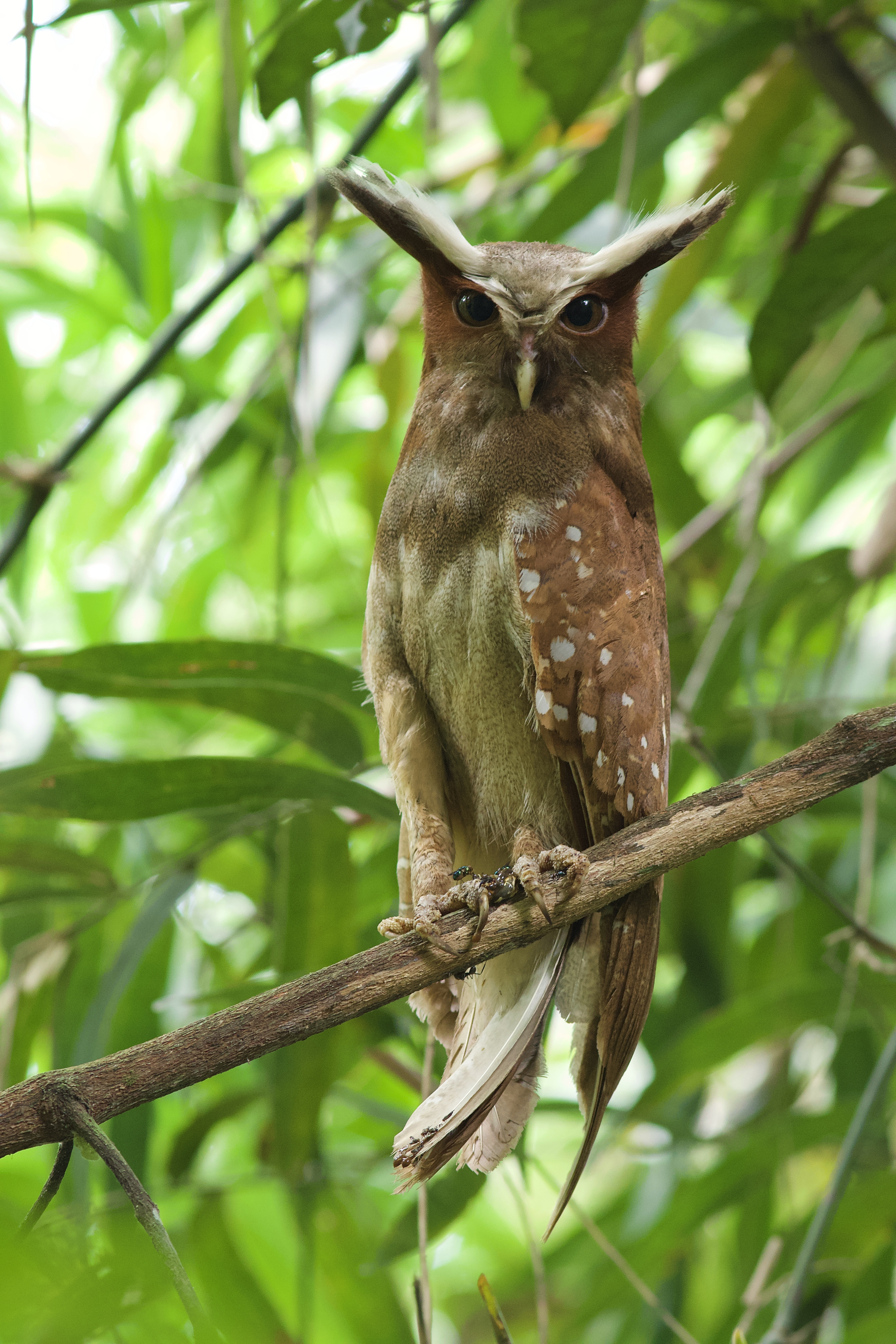
Crested owl (Lophostrix cristata)

=== Late Quaternary prehistoric extinctions ===
- Genus Grallistrix – stilt-owls, four species
  - Kaua'i stilt-owl, Grallistrix auceps
  - Maui stilt-owl, Grallistrix erdmani
  - Moloka'i stilt-owl, Grallistrix geleches
  - O'ahu stilt-owl, Grallistrix orion
- Genus Ornimegalonyx – Caribbean giant owls, one or two species
  - Cuban giant owl, Ornimegalonyx oteroi
  - Ornimegalonyx sp. – probably subspecies of O. oteroi
- Genus Asphaltoglaux
  - Asphalt miniature owl, Asphaltoglaux cecileae
- Genus Oraristrix
  - La Brea owl, Oraristrix brea

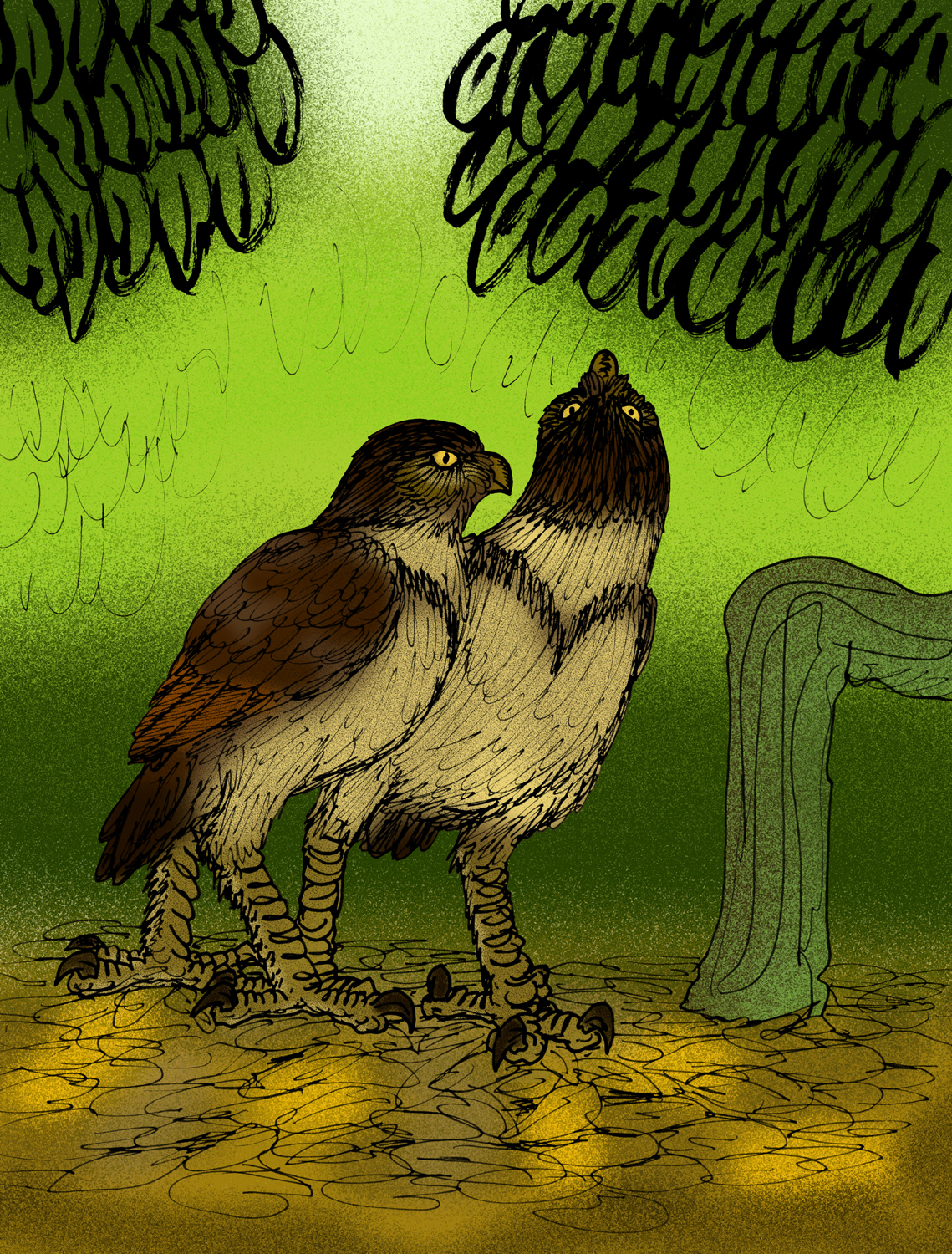
The extinct Cuban giant owl (†Ornimegalonyx oteroi)

=== Fossil record ===
- Mioglaux (Late Oligocene? – Early Miocene of WC Europe) – includes "Bubo" poirreiri
- Intulula (Early/Middle Miocene of WC Europe) – includes "Strix/Ninox" brevis
- Yarquen (Middle Miocene of Argentina)
- Alasio (Middle Miocene of Vieux-Collonges, France) – includes "Strix" collongensis

The fossil database for Strigiformes is highly diverse and shows an origin from ~60 Mya into the Pleistocene. The maximum age range for the Strigiformes clade extends to 68.6 Mya.

Placement unresolved:

- "Otus/Strix" wintershofensis – fossil (Early/Middle Miocene of Wintershof West, Germany) – may be close to extant genus Ninox
- "Strix" edwardsi – fossil (Middle Miocene of Grive-Saint-Alban, France)
- "Asio" pygmaeus – fossil (Early Pliocene of Odesa, Ukraine)
- Strigidae gen. et sp. indet. UMMP V31030 (Rexroad Late Pliocene of Kansas, US) – Strix/Bubo?
- Ibiza owl, Strigidae gen. et sp. indet. – prehistoric (Late Pleistocene/Holocene of Es Pouàs, Ibiza)

The supposed fossil heron "Ardea" lignitum (Late Pliocene of Germany) was apparently a strigid owl, possibly close to Bubo. The Early–Middle Eocene genus Palaeoglaux from west-central Europe is sometimes placed here, but given its age, it is probably better considered its own family for the time being.

== Bibliography ==
- Olson, Storrs L. (1985). The fossil record of birds. In: Farner, D.S.; King, J.R. & Parkes, Kenneth C. (eds.): Avian Biology 8: 79–238. Academic Press, New York.
