= Edward Burton (zoologist) =

British Army surgeon and zoologist

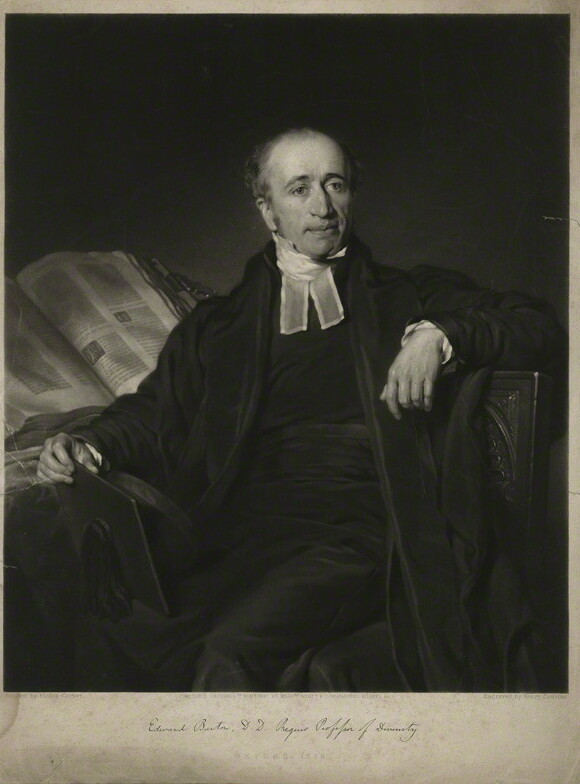
- Born: 1790; Southampton, Hampshire, England
- Died: 11 March 1867 (age 67); Hollingbourne, Kent
- Burial place: Boxley, Kent
- Occupations: Army surgeon, zoologist
- Notable work: A Catalogue of the Collection of Mammalia and Birds in the Museum of the Army Medical Department at Fort Pitt, Chatham

Edward Burton FRS FLS (1790 – 11 March 1867) was a British Army surgeon and a zoologist. He was also a magistrate for Kent.

== Life ==
Little is known of Burton's life. He may have studied at St. George's Hospital, London. (Note: Manuscript notes made at St George's Hospital in 1807 by an Edward Burton have been preserved in Royal Army Medical Corps records.) The earliest record of his military career is in 1813, when he was attached to the 12th Foot, and was promoted from Hospital-Mate to Assistant-Surgeon. In 1818, he transferred between units. In 1826, he was attached to the 9th Light Dragoons, and was promoted Surgeon to the Forces. In 1837, he retired on half-pay.

Burton was stationed at Fort Pitt, Chatham from 1829 to 1837. In 1838, he compiled A Catalogue of the Collection of Mammalia and Birds in the Museum of the Army Medical Department at Fort Pitt, Chatham. He wrote in its Preface, "This task has been undertaken at such broken and uncertain periods as his professional duties left at the disposal of its author".

He described several species of bird, for some of which he is the valid binomial authority.

Burton may have been the author of an 1821 paper relating to Pelecanus aquilus Linn. (Note: Ascension frigatebird, Fregata aquila.) on Ascension Island. He has been identified as the man who in 1835 displayed a specimen of a species of Ratelus (Note: Perhaps the honey badger Mellivora capensis indica (Indian ratel).) at the Zoological Society of London. He has also been identified as the man who in 1836 communicated a description of Pipra squalida, (Note: Thick-billed flowerpecker, Dicaeum agile.) a Himalayan flowerpecker, to the Zoological Society.

== Legacy ==
Three species have been named in Burton's honour: a bird, the spectacled finch (Callacanthis burtoni ); and two lizards, Burton's legless lizard (Lialis burtonis) and Burton's nessia (Nessia burtonii ). A fourth species may have been named in his honour: a mammal, Burton's gerbil (Gerbillus burtoni ).
