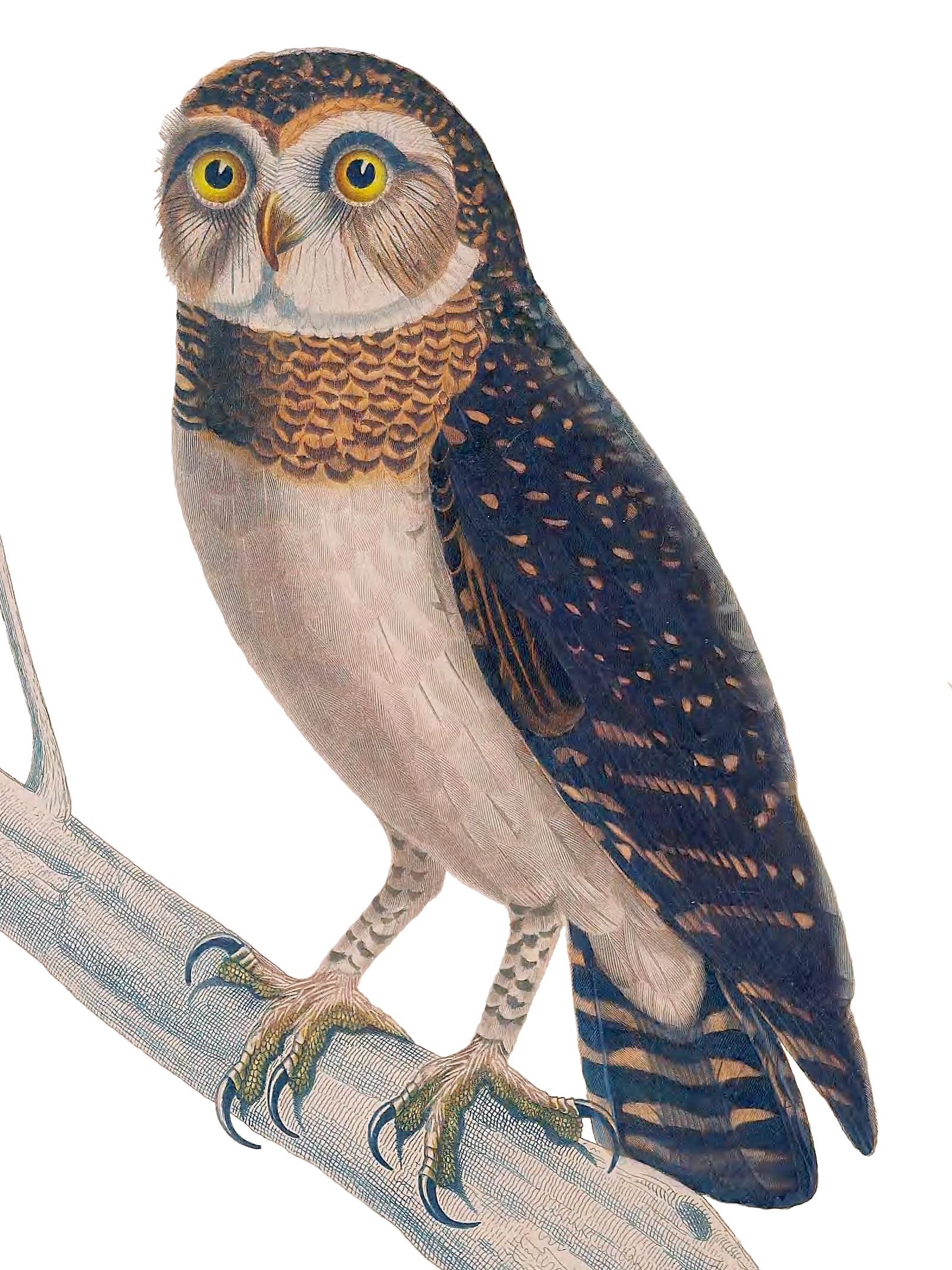

Conservation status
- Least Concern (IUCN 3.1)
- CITES Appendix II

Scientific classification
- Kingdom: Animalia
- Phylum: Chordata
- Class: Aves
- Order: Strigiformes
- Family: Strigidae
- Genus: Athene
- Species: A. jacquinoti

Binomial name
- Athene jacquinoti Bonaparte, 1850

Synonyms
- Ninox jacquinoti

= West Solomons owl =

Species of owl

The West Solomons owl (Athene jacquinoti), also referred to as the West Solomons boobook, is a small to medium-sized owl, measuring 23–31 cm (9.1–12.2 in) in length. Its upperparts are rusty brown, sometimes spotted or barred with white, its chest is buffy white, sometimes spotted or barred with brown, and its creamy belly is unmarked. It has a grayish-brown facial disc, edged by narrow white eyebrows and a band of white across the throat.

When he first described the species in 1850, Charles Lucien Bonaparte assigned it to the genus Athene. It was later reclassified in the genus Ninox, which contains many other small owls found throughout the Indo-Pacific, but later phylogenetic studies have found it to group within the genus Athene. The specific epithet honors Charles Hector Jacquinot, a French explorer who spent considerable time in the Pacific. Its common name refers the Solomon Islands, on which it occurs.

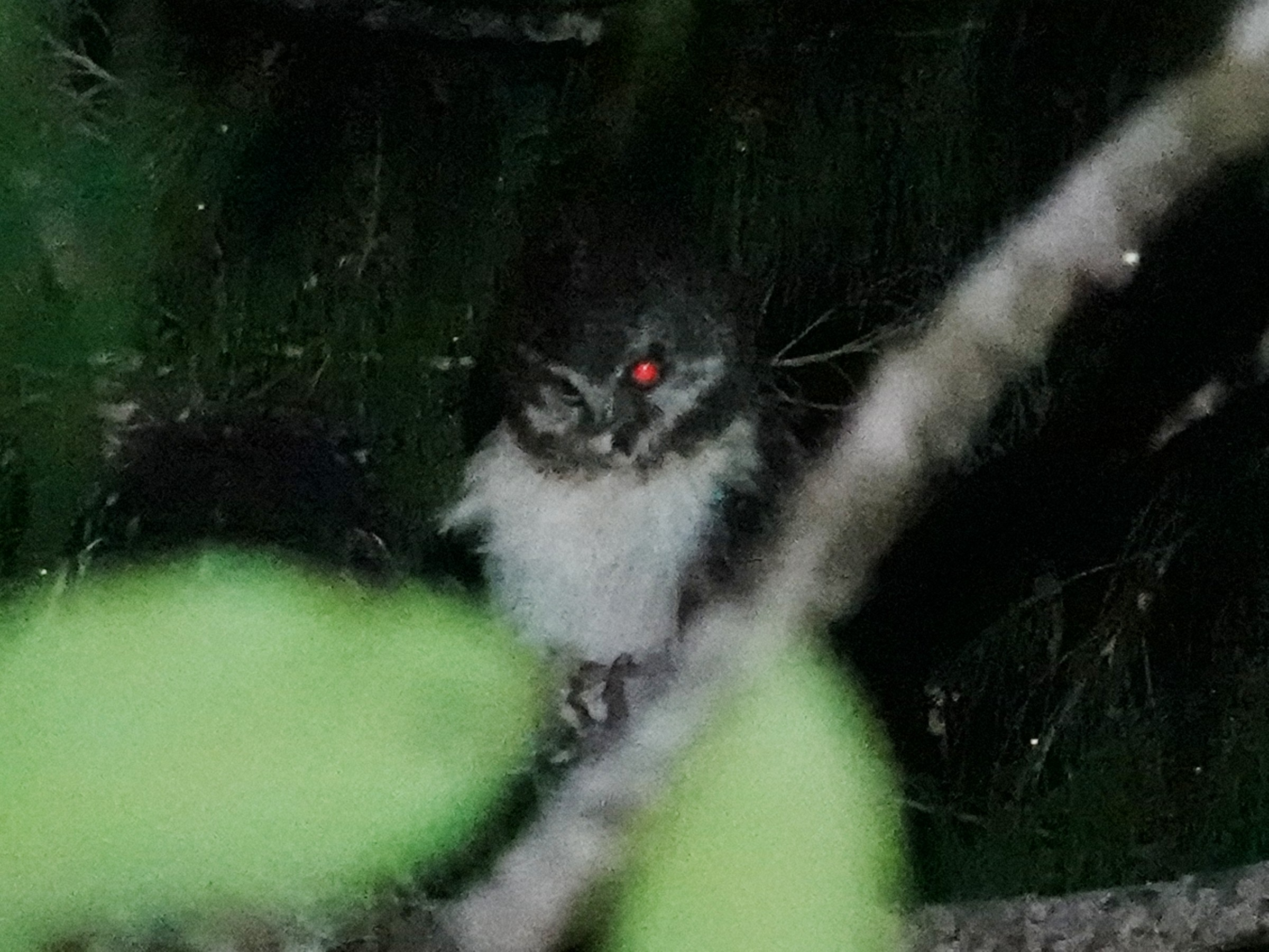
In Bougainville

It is native to the western portion of Solomon Islands archipelago, where it is found in tropical or subtropical moist forests in lowlands and foothills, up to an altitude of 1,500 m (4,900 ft) above sea level. Subspecies on Guadalcanal, Malaita, and Bauro & Makira have been found to be distinct species, and split as the Guadalcanal owl (N. granti), Malaita owl (N. malaitae), and the Makira owl (N. roseoaxillaris) respectively. Together, they were collectively known as the Solomons boobook. It is nocturnal, hunting primarily insects and small vertebrates. By day, it roosts either in a cavity or in the main fork of a tree.

Although the global population has not been quantified, it's reported to be widespread and common within its restricted range. The population trend appears to be stable, though small numbers of both adults and juveniles are known to be taken from the wild to serve as pets.
