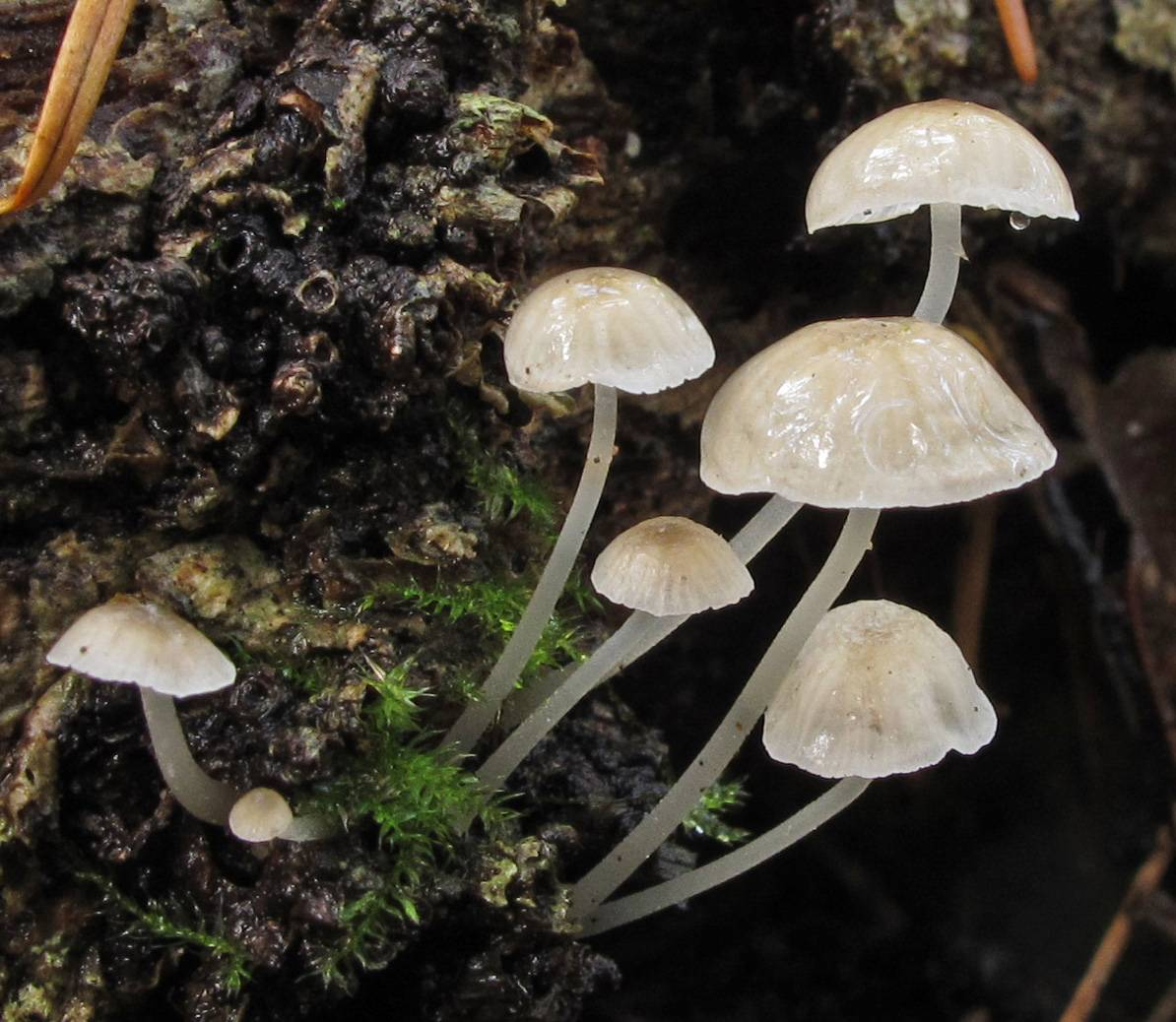
- Phloeomana speirea

Scientific classification
- Kingdom: Fungi
- Division: Basidiomycota
- Class: Agaricomycetes
- Order: Agaricales
- Family: Porotheleaceae
- Genus: Phloeomana; Redhead (2013)

Type species
- Phloeomana speirea (Fr.) Redhead (2013)

Species
- Phloeomana alba Phloeomana clavata Phloeomana hiemalis Phloeomana minutula Phloeomana speirea

= Phloeomana =

Genus of fungi

Phloeomana is a bark-inhabiting agaric fungal genus that produces fuscous-colored to whitish mycenoid to omphalinoid fruit bodies in temperate forests. In addition to the type species Phloeomana speirea, 4 other species, P. alba, P. clavata (= M. thujina, M. phaeophylla), P. hiemalis and P. minutula (formerly Mycena olida), have been placed in the genus. The genus is characterized by nonamyloid smooth, hyaline (translucent) basidiospores and tissues, poorly to moderately differentiated cheilocystidia, diverticulate pileipellis hyphae and general smooth stipe hyphae with scattered caulocystidia. It is one of several mushroom genera formerly classified most recently in Mycena, Omphalina, Hydropus, or Marasmiellus. Phylogenetically, Phloeomana is distant from the Mycenaceae and is closest to a clade or group that includes other former members of Mycena now in Atheniella and Hemimycena clearly excluded from the Mycenaceae and tentatively classified in the Porotheleaceae.

== Etymology ==
The name Phloeomana is an oblique reference to bark and phloem on which it grows and the oceanic term, 'mana' in reference to a being or spirit, hence a bark spirit.
