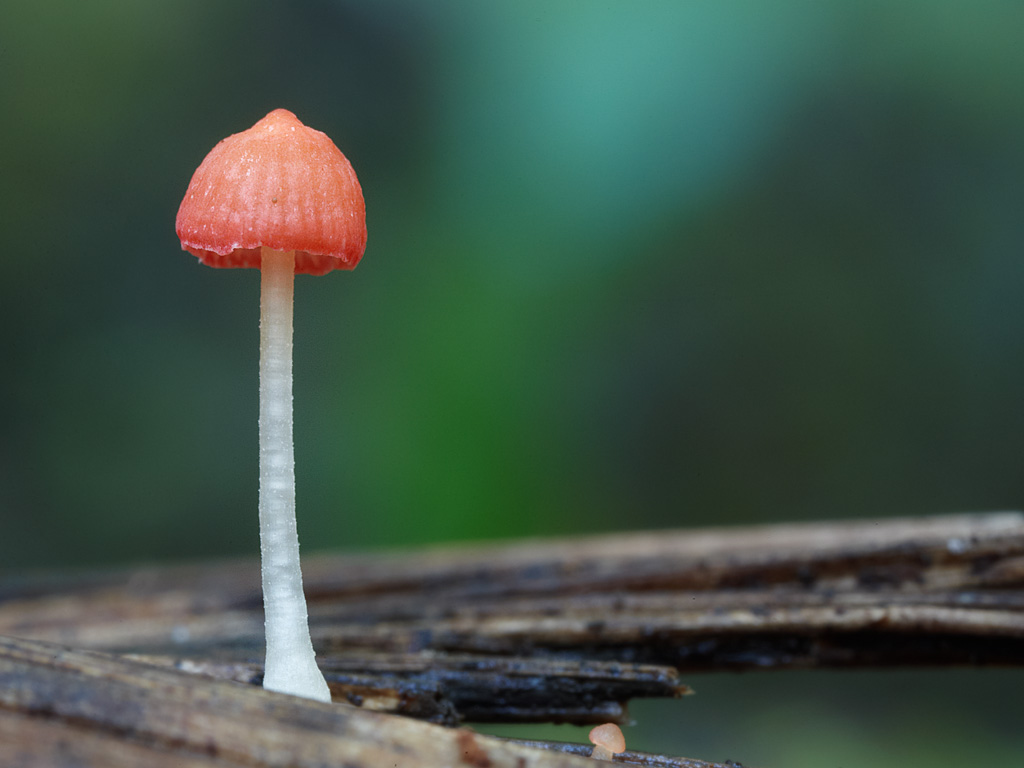

Scientific classification
- Domain: Eukaryota
- Kingdom: Fungi
- Division: Basidiomycota
- Class: Agaricomycetes
- Order: Agaricales
- Family: Cyphellaceae
- Genus: Atheniella
- Species: A. adonis

Binomial name
- Atheniella adonis (Bull.) Redhead, Moncalvo, Vilgalys, Desjardin & B.A. Perry

Synonyms
- Agaricus adonis Bull. Hemimycena adonis (Bull.) Singer; Marasmiellus adonis (Bull.) Singer Mycena adonis (Bull.) Gray

= Atheniella adonis =

Species of fungus

Atheniella adonis Mycological characteristics
- Gills on hymenium
- Cap is conical
- Hymenium is adnate
- Stipe is bare
- Spore print is white
- Ecology is saprotrophic
- Edibility is inedible

Atheniella adonis, which has the recommended name of scarlet bonnet in the UK, is a species of agaric in the family Cyphellaceae.It produces small orangish to reddish mushrooms with caps up to 1.2 cm (0.5 in) in diameter and thin pinkish-white stems reaching 4 cm (1.6 in) long. The fungus typically grows in conifer woods in Eurasia and North America.

== Taxonomy ==
The species was first named Agaricus adonis in 1792 by Jean Baptiste François Pierre Bulliard, and placed in Mycena by Samuel Frederick Gray in 1821. Rolf Singer successively moved it to Hemimycena (1943), then Marasmiellus (1951). Singer later changed his mind about these placements, in 1986 considering the species a Mycena.

Recent molecular research, based on cladistic analysis of DNA sequences, has shown that the species is not closely related to Mycena and belongs in the Cyphellaceae in the genus Atheniella.

=== Etymology ===
The species epithet refers to the handsome youth Adonis in Greek mythology. Samuel Frederick Gray called it the "Adonis high-stool" in his 1821 Natural Arrangement of British Plants, while Mordecai Cubitt Cooke named it the "delicate Mycena".

== Description ==
The cap initially has a sharply conic shape, but expands to a narrow bell-shape or a broad cone in maturity, typically reaching 0.5 to 1.2 cm (1/4 to 1/2 in) in diameter. It is scarlet red when young, becoming orange to yellowish. The cap margin, which is initially pressed against the stem, is opaque or nearly so at first. The mushroom is hygrophanous, and fades to an orange buff when dry. The flesh is thin, the same color as the cap, fragile, and without any distinctive taste or odor.

The gills are ascending-adnate (attaching at much less than a right angle, appearing to curve upward toward stem) or attached by a tooth, subdistant to close, with 14–16 gills reaching the stem. Additionally, there are two or three tiers of lamellulae—short gills that do not extend fully from the cap edge to the stem. The gills are narrow, and yellowish or with a reddish tinge at first; the margins are paler and the same color as the faces. The stem is 2–4 cm (3/4–1 5/8 in) long and 1–2 mm (1/32–3/32 in) thick, and roughly equal in width throughout. It is tubular, fragile, initially pruinose (covered with a fine powder), polished and smooth with age, pale yellow, becoming whitish, with the base often dirty yellow or brownish.

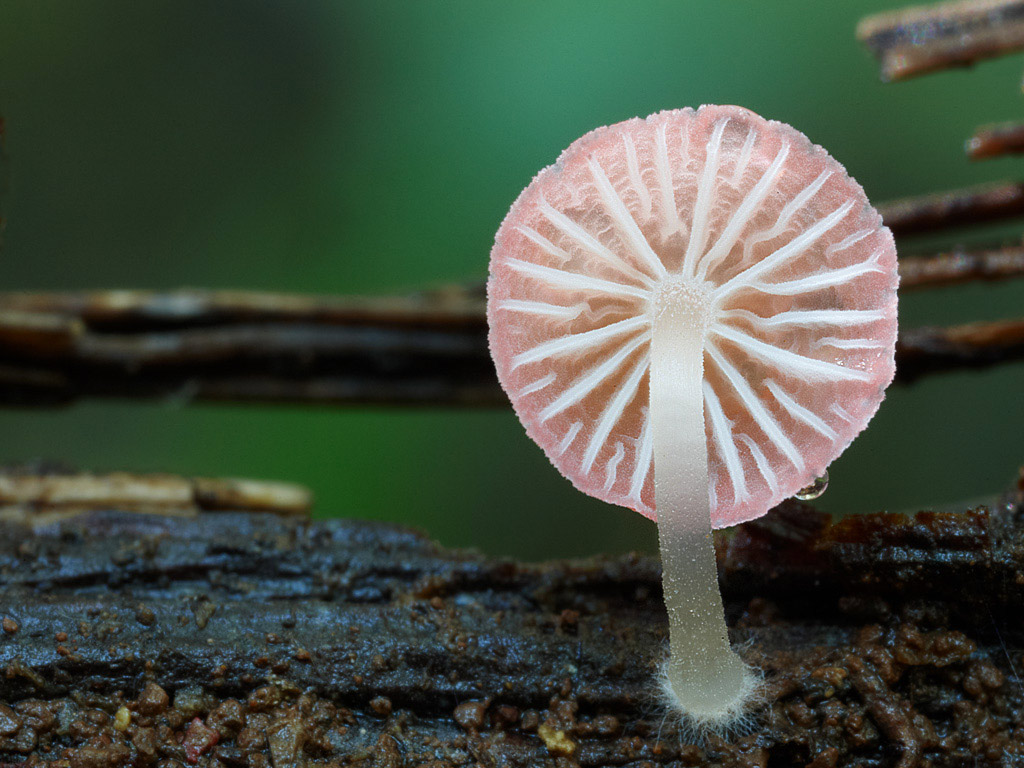
Cap underside

=== Microscopic characteristics ===
The spores are narrowly ellipsoid, inamyloid, and measure 6–7 by 3–3.5 μm. The basidia (spore-bearing cells) are four-spored and measure 20–22 by 6–7 μm. The cheilocystidia and pleurocystidia (cystidia found on the edges and faces, respectively, of the gills) are abundant and similar in shape and markings, 40–58 by 10–15 μm, tapering somewhat on either end and usually with a long needle-shaped neck (which is branched in some). The cystidia are generally smooth, but when dried material is mounted in potassium hydroxide for observation under light microscopy, an amorphous substance apparently holds spores and debris around the neck or apex, making them appear encrusted. The flesh of the gill is very faintly vinaceous-brown when stained in iodine. The cap flesh has a thin, poorly differentiated pellicle with a region of slightly enlarged cells beneath it; the remainder is filamentous, and the filamentous portion stains vinaceous-brown in iodine.

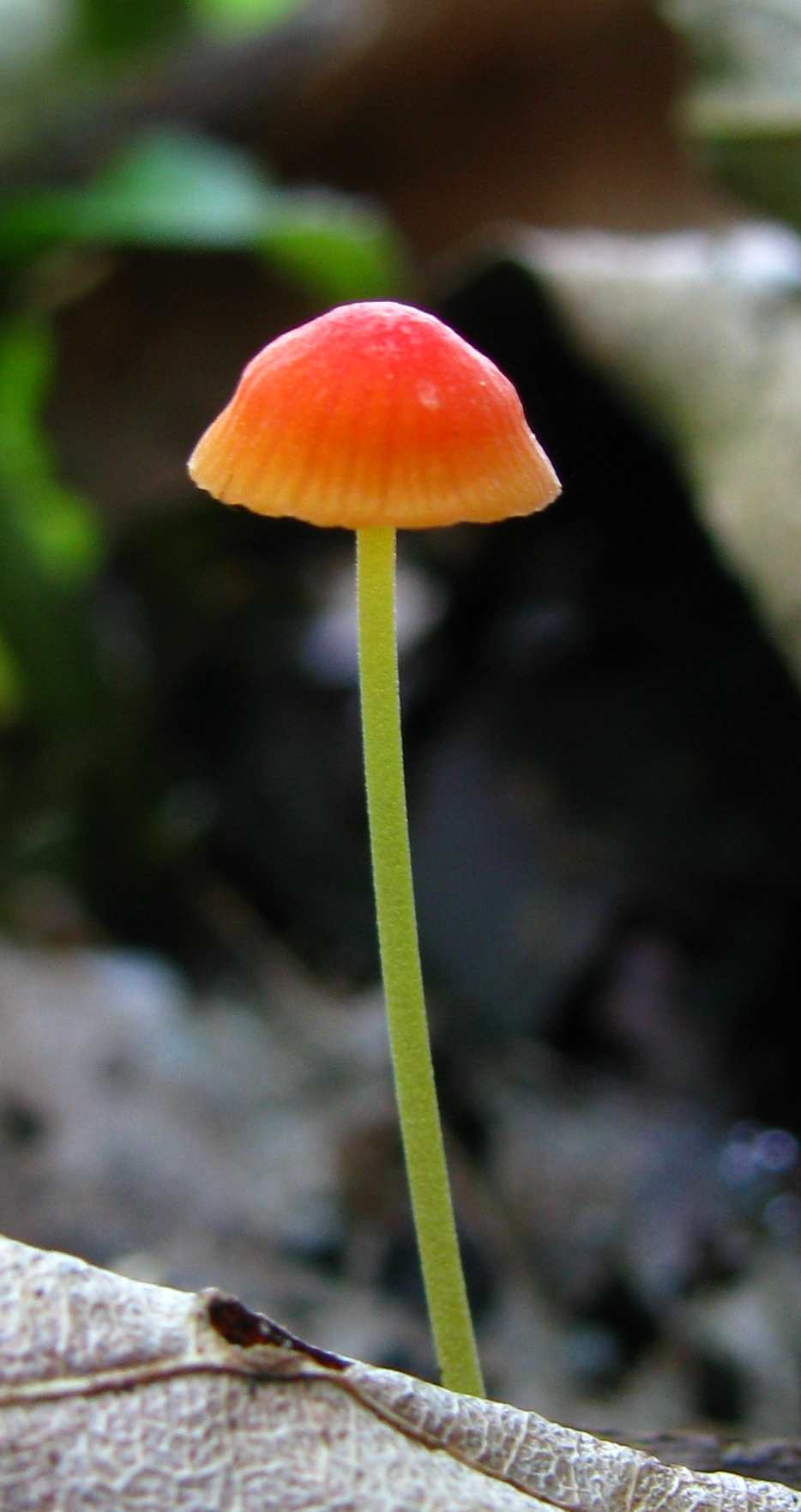
The smaller Mycena acicula fades from red to bright orange (yellow near the margin).

=== Similar species ===
Atheniella aurantiidisca can be distinguished by its lack of scarlet to pinkish tones in the cap and lack of gelatinized cortical hyphae. A. flavoalba is usually pale yellow.

Mycena acicula is typically smaller with a deep orange-red cap rather than the typical bright salmon pink of A. adonis. Since the colors and sizes of M. acicula and A. adonis are similar, a microscope is needed to reliably distinguish between them, with spore size and shape being different. Mycena strobilinoides can be distinguished by its orange cap and amyloid spores. Mycena oregonensis is differentiated by its orange to yellow cap and lack of scarlet to pinkish tones. Mycena roseipallens has a smaller fruit body, wider spores, a less intensely colored and less conical cap, and grows on the decaying wood of elm, ash, and alder. Mycena rosella is never fully coral pink.

== Habitat and distribution ==
The fruit bodies of A. adonis grow solitarily or in groups in conifer forests and heaths, and appear in the spring and autumn. The fruit bodies grow in groups or scattered on needle beds under spruce and hemlock in wet coastal conifer forests, or in the higher mountains, where it is not uncommon in the spring and autumn months.

The fungus is found in Europe and in western North America, where Mycena specialist Alexander H. Smith found the species in Washington, Oregon, and California. In 2007, it was reported from the valley of the Ussuri River in the northeast of China.

== Ecology ==
In one instance, fruit bodies were found growing on the deciduous trees Spanish Maple (Acer granatense) and willow (Salix alba) near Amsterdam. It was hypothesized that the bark of these trees had become more acidic in recent years because of increasing atmospheric pollution (specifically, increases in the levels of sulfuric and nitric acid from industrial smoke), providing a more suitable substrate for the fungus.
