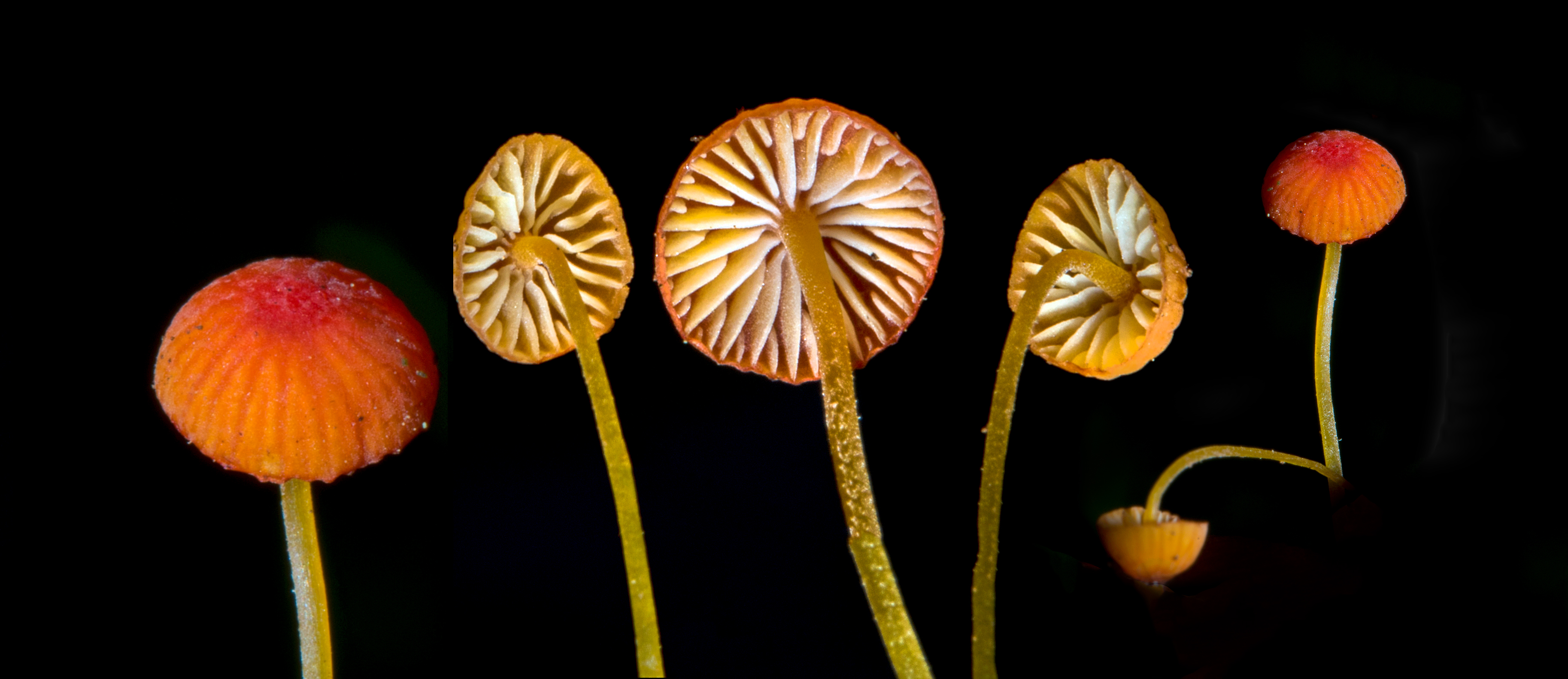

Scientific classification
- Kingdom: Fungi
- Division: Basidiomycota
- Class: Agaricomycetes
- Order: Agaricales
- Family: Mycenaceae
- Genus: Mycena
- Species: M. acicula

Binomial name
- Mycena acicula (Schaeff.) P.Kumm. (1871)

Synonyms
- Agaricus acicula Schaeff. (1774); Agaricus miniatus Batsch (1783); Hemimycena acicula (Schaeff.) Singer (1938); Marasmiellus acicula (Schaeff.) Singer (1951)

= Mycena acicula =

Species of fungus

Mycena acicula
- Mycological characteristics
- Gills on hymenium
- Cap is conical or campanulate
- Hymenium is adnate
- Stipe is bare
- Spore print is white
- Ecology is saprotrophic
- Edibility is inedible

Mycena acicula, commonly known as the orange bonnet, or the coral spring Mycena, is a species of fungus in the family Mycenaceae.

The mushrooms have small orange-red caps, up to 1 cm (0.4 in) in diameter, held by slender yellowish stems up to 6 cm (2.4 in) long. The gills are pale yellow with a whitish edge. Several other Mycena species look similar, but may be distinguished by differences in size and/or microscopic characteristics.

The fungus grows on dead twigs and other woody debris of forest floors, especially along streams and other wet places. It is found in Eurasia, North America, and the Caribbean. It considered inedible because of its small size.

== Taxonomy ==
First named Agaricus acicula by the German scientist Jacob Christian Schäffer in 1774, the species was also referred to as Agaricus miniatus by another German, naturalist August Batsch. It was given its current name in 1871 by Paul Kummer. Rolf Singer transferred the species to the genera Hemimycena and Marasmiellus, but the binomials resulting from these transfers are now considered synonyms. The fungus is classified in the section Aciculae of the genus Mycena.

The specific epithet acicula is derived from the Latin word meaning "small needle". The mushroom is commonly known as the "orange bonnet", or the "coral spring Mycena".

== Description ==
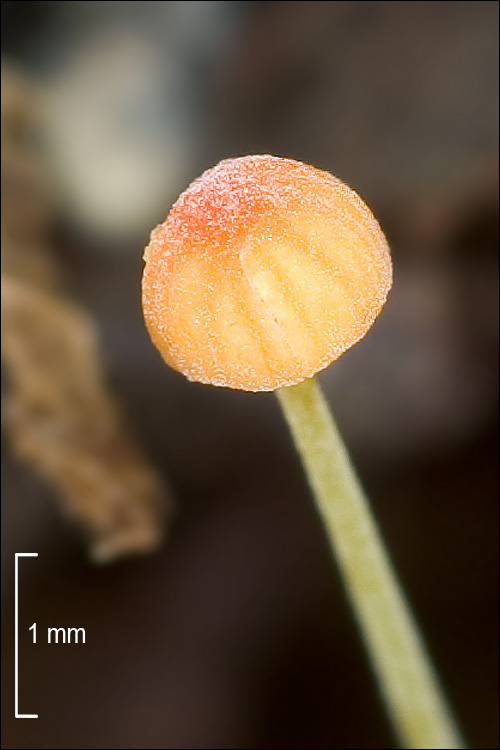
Close-up of pruinose (powdery) cap surface

The cap is initially convex, but as it matures, it expands to a bell-shape, typically reaching 0.3 to 1 cm (0.1 to 0.4 in) in diameter. The cap sometimes has a small abrupt umbo (a central bump), and the cap margin is pressed closely against the stem when young, often flaring or curving slightly inward. As the cap expands, a narrow sterile (i.e., without any reproductive cells typical of the hymenium) band which frequently becomes lobed or irregularly-jagged often forms at the extreme margin. The cap surface is smooth, faintly translucent-striate when moist, at first pruinose but soon naked. The color is red when young, soon becoming yellowish toward the margin, and slowly fading to bright orange-yellow. The flesh is thin, brittle, yellow, and has no distinctive odor or taste.

The gills are adnate (with gills broadly attached to the stem, slightly above the bottom of the gill, with most of the gill fused to the stem) or slightly rounded next to the stem. The individual gills are close to subdistant, with between 10–14 reaching the stem, and two or three tiers of lamellulae (short gills that do not reach the stem). The gills are moderately broad, pale orange to whitish, often yellowish at the base and whitish along the edges. The stem is 1 to 6 cm (0.4 to 2.4 in) long, and up to 1 mm thick; flexuous (winding from side to side), brittle, with the base covered with sharp, straight, and stiff white hairs. The surface is densely white-pruinose initially, but soon becomes naked with a subsequent color shift to orange-yellow or lemon yellow. This species has been described as "a delight to behold", but "one usually has to get down on hands and knees to find it!" The spore print is white.

=== Microscopic characteristics ===
The spores are roughly spindle-shaped (i.e., tapering at each end), with dimensions of 9–11 by 3.5–4.5 μm. They are nonamyloid, meaning they do not take up iodine when stained with Melzer's reagent. The spore-bearing cells, the basidia, are club-shaped, four-spored and measure 20–22 by 5–6 μm. The cheilocystidium and pleurocystidia (cystidia found on the edge and face, respectively, of a gill) are similar, club-shaped to spindle-shaped or egg-shaped, and have apices that are often covered with a resinous secretion. The hyphae that comprise the cap cuticle are up to 3.5 μm wide, clamped, and covered with cylindrical excrescences that measure 2–9 by 1–3 μm. The hyphae of the cortical layer of the stem are up to 4.5 μm wide, clamped, and densely covered with simple to somewhat branched, cylindrical to inflated excrescences that are up to 20 by 5 μm. These latter excrescences are embedded in gelatinous matter.

=== Similar species ===
Mycena adonis, M. floridula, and M. leptophylla are larger species of the section Adonidae in the genus Mycena. In that section, among other differences, the hyphae of the cortical layer (the outer layer of tissue) of the stem are smooth. M. oregonensis is similar in appearance to M. acicula, but the cap is yellower, the gills are broadly adnate or decurrent with a short tooth, the gill edge is orange to bright yellow, and the stem is dry, not sticky. The hyphae of the cortical layer of the stem are smooth and not embedded in gelatinous matter, and in European collections the basidia are two-spored and do not have clamps. M. strobilinoides, a North American and European species, looks similar with its orange cap, but may be distinguished microscopically by the cheilocystidia which are densely covered by excrescences; it also has a larger cap, up to 2 cm (0.8 in). M. aurantiidisca can be distinguished by the reddish-orange cap which tends to become paler at the margin. Mycena specialist Alexander H. Smith further noted of M. acicula that it could readily be mistaken for a Hygrophorus. Atheniella aurantiidisca and Rickenella fibula are also similar.

== Habitat and distribution ==
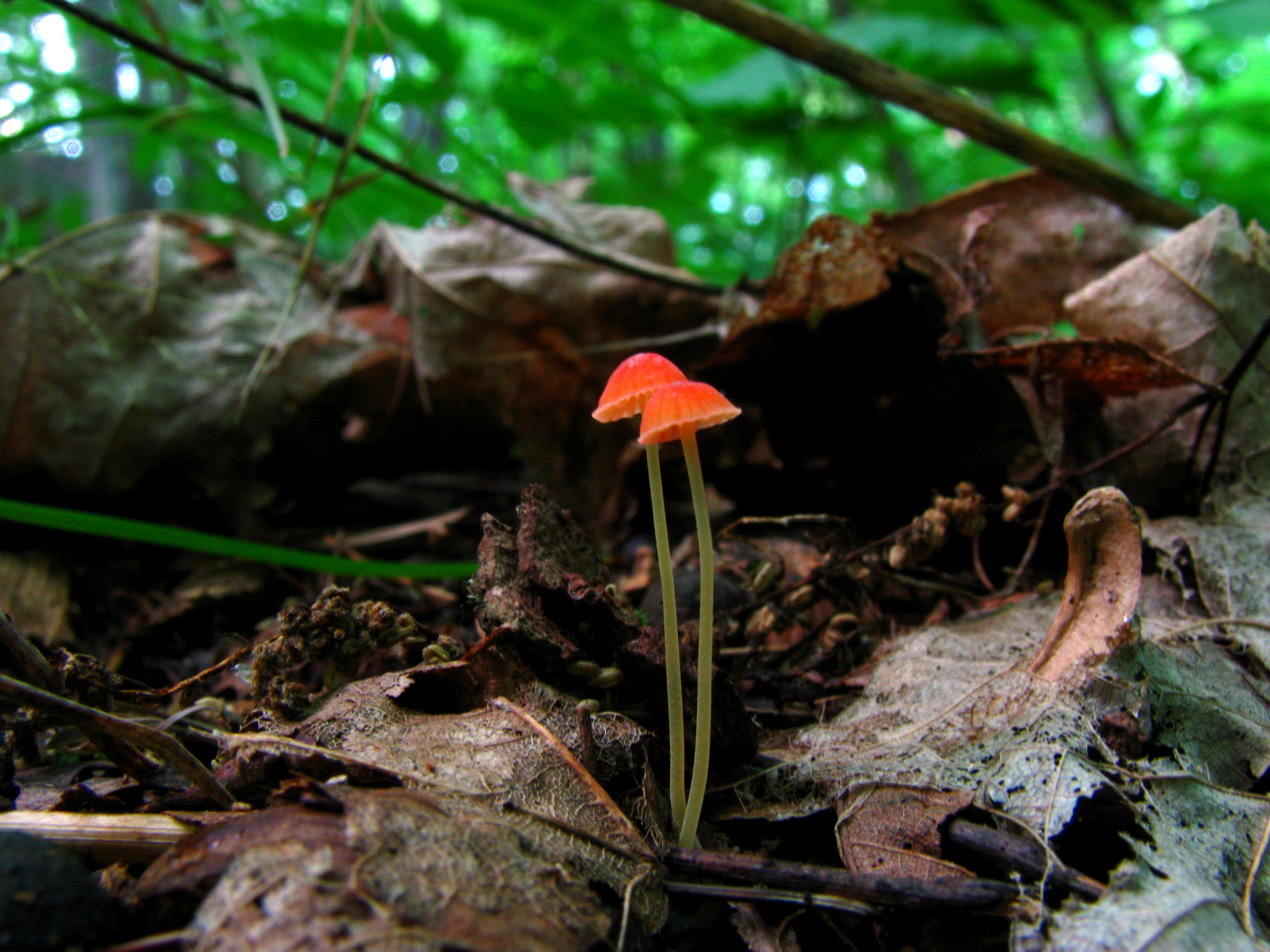
Typical growth habit

The fruit bodies grow singly, in groups, or somewhat clustered on debris in wet places, especially along streams or the borders of swamps. The appearance of the fruit bodies is not significantly influenced by the effect of rainfall, perhaps because "such minute fungi are largely determined by the microenvironment prevailing under dense vegetation, etc., which is no doubt less affected by recent rain than more exposed situations." The fungus is widely distributed throughout the eastern United States and Canada and occurs in Washington, Oregon, and California along the Pacific Coast. It has also been reported from Trinidad, Britain, Norway, Spain, Korea, and the Ussuri River Valley in the northeast of China.

== Edibility ==
The fruit bodies are considered inedible, owing to their small and insubstantial properties.
