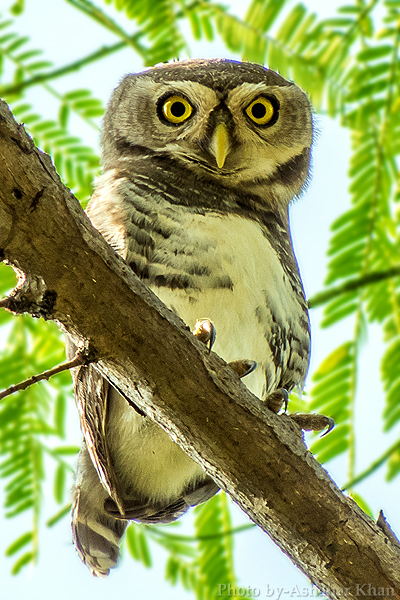
- Forest owlet at Melghat Tiger Reserve

Conservation status
- Endangered (IUCN 3.1)
- CITES Appendix I

Scientific classification
- Kingdom: Animalia
- Phylum: Chordata
- Class: Aves
- Order: Strigiformes
- Family: Strigidae
- Genus: Athene
- Species: A. blewitti

Binomial name
- Athene blewitti (Hume, 1873)
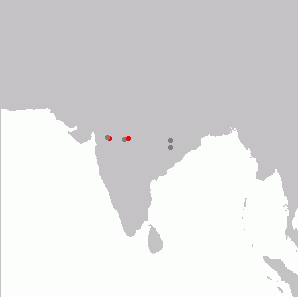
- Current records in red and historic records in grey

Synonyms
- Heteroglaux blewitti

= Forest owlet =

Species of owl

The forest owlet (Athene blewitti) is endemic to the forests of central India. It is listed as Endangered on the IUCN Red List since 2018, as the population is estimated at fewer than 1,000 mature individuals. It is threatened foremost by deforestation.

It is a member of the typical owl family Strigidae, and was first described in 1873. As it was not sighted after 1884, it was considered extinct for many years. In 1997, it was rediscovered by Pamela Rasmussen. Searches in the locality mentioned on the label of the last collected specimen failed, and it turned out that the specimen had been stolen from the British Museum by Richard Meinertzhagen and resubmitted with a label bearing false locality information.

== Taxonomy ==
Heteroglaux blewitti was the scientific name proposed by Allan Octavian Hume in 1873 who described a female owlet that had been shot near Basna in 1872 by his collaborator Francis Robert Blewitt (born 1815). Hume noted that the head is smaller than in other Athene species and that the lower mandible was more strongly notched. He therefore placed it in a new genus Heteroglaux. Results of a phylogenetic study published in 2018 indicate that it is a member of the Athene clade.

== Description ==
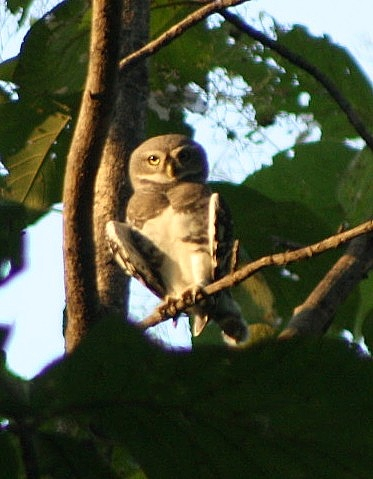
The whitish underside and small size are distinctive

The forest owlet is small (23 cm) and stocky. It is a typical owlet with a rather unspotted crown and heavily banded wings and tail. They have a relatively large skull and beak. Unlike the spotted owlet, the forest owlet has the fewer and fainter spots on the crown and back. The upperparts are dark grey-brown. The upper breast is almost solid brown and the sides are barred with a white central wedge in the lower breast that is sometimes unmarked, especially in males. The primaries are darker and distinct. The wings and tail are banded with white trailing edges. A dark carpal patch on the underwing is visible in flight. The facial disc is pale and the eyes are yellow.

== Distribution and habitat ==
The forest owlet was recorded in central India, and until 1997 was known from just seven specimens in museums collected in northern Maharashtra, and south-east Madhya Pradesh or western Odisha. The last record until then was based on a specimen claimed from Gujarat in 1914 by Richard Meinertzhagen. Searches in Gujarat had been futile until the species was rediscovered in November 1997 by a group of American ornithologists in the foothills of the Satpura Range, northeast of Bombay. The cause of the earlier failed searches was due to the resubmission of a stolen specimen with the falsification of locality data.

The forest owlet was observed in Odisha, Chhattisgarh, Madhya Pradesh, Maharashtra and Gujarat, and at a few locations in Melghat Tiger Reserve in Maharashtra. A survey in 2011 in non-protected areas of Maharashtra and Madhya Pradesh confirmed the presence of the species at two locations. In Maharashtra, a pair was observed (out of 7 pairs in 2004) in Toranmal Reserve Forest. In Madhya Pradesh, six individuals were observed in Khaknar. In Maharashtra, it was also reported to inhabit the forest ranges of Taloda and Khaknaar.

All these places in central India harbour dense to open deciduous forests with Tectona grandis, Lagerstroemia parvifolia, Boswellia serrata and Lannea grandis trees. Nest cavities were found at a height of 5.0–8.0 m (16.4–26.2 feet) in trees like Soymida febrifuga. In most areas, the trees were too young and lacking cavities suitable for nesting. An individual was sighted in Tansa Wildlife Sanctuary in the Thane district in 2014. It was reported that human disturbed forests with more clearings within the forests were preferred for foraging. In Toranmal Reserve Forest, the forest owlet utilized areas with open canopy and dense undergrowth.

In Gujarat, the forest owlet occurs in Purna Wildlife Sanctuary.

== Behaviour and ecology ==
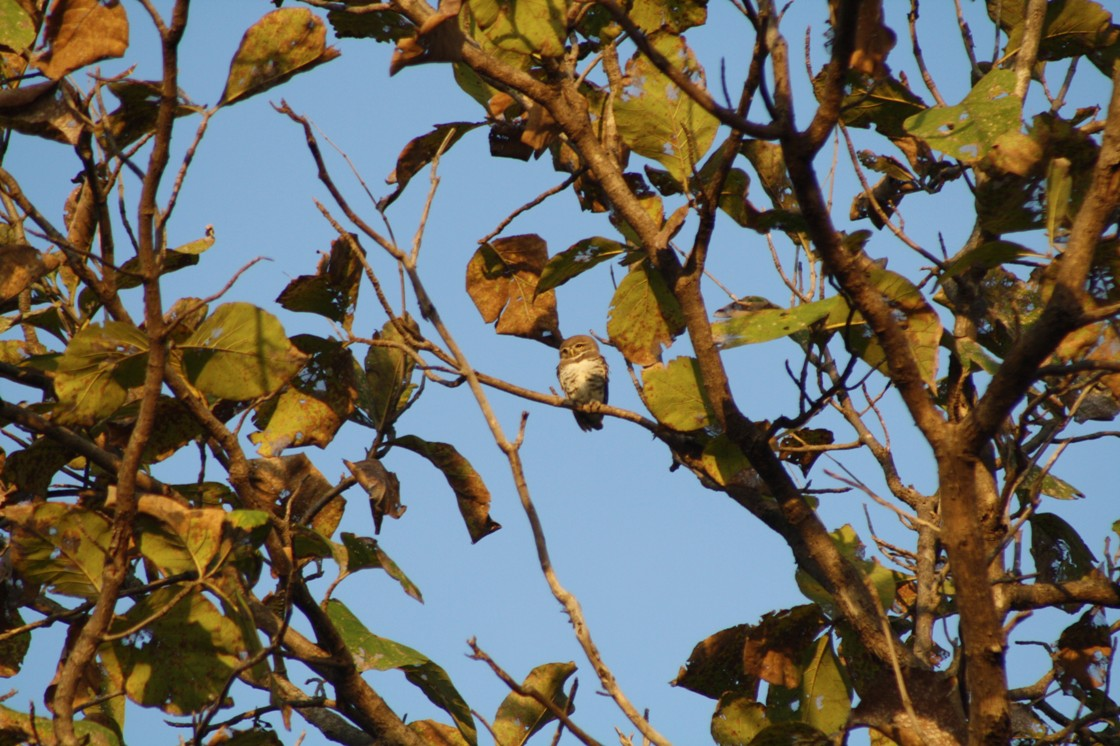

The forest owlet typically hunts from perches where it sits still and waits for prey. When perched, it flicks its tail from side to side rapidly and more excitedly when it chases prey. Lizards and skinks constitute nearly 60% of its prey, rodents 15%, birds 2% and the remainder invertebrates and frogs. When nesting, the male hunts and feeds the female at nest, and the female feeds the young. The nestlings fledge after 30–32 days.

A study conducted in the forests of Madhya Pradesh revealed that the forest owlet is a generalist predator that consumes a variety of small mammals.

The peak courtship season is in January and February during which time they are very responsive to call playback with a mixture of song and territorial calls.

The forest owlet appears to be strongly diurnal, although not very active after 10 in the morning; it often hunts during daytime. On cold winter mornings, it basks on top of tall trees.

Filial cannibalism by males has been observed.

=== Vocalization ===
They make several different calls, which include a hissing call of short duration. The song calls are short and mellow unlike those of most owls. They are usually disyllabic, "oh-owow" but sound monosyllabic and each note ascends and descends rapidly. The territorial calls have been transcribed as "kwaak ... kk, kwaa...kk". A contact call of "kee yah, kee...yah" is given when the male brings food to the female at nest. The alarm call is a "chirrur... chirrur, chirr...chirr", while begging "kee...k, kee...k" calls are made when young or females seek food.

== Conservation ==
The forest owlet is listed in CITES Appendix I. In 2018, it was assessed as being Endangered, with a population estimate of about 250 mature individuals. It is threatened by loss and degradation of forests due to illegal logging, encroachment by humans, forest fires and construction of irrigation dams.
