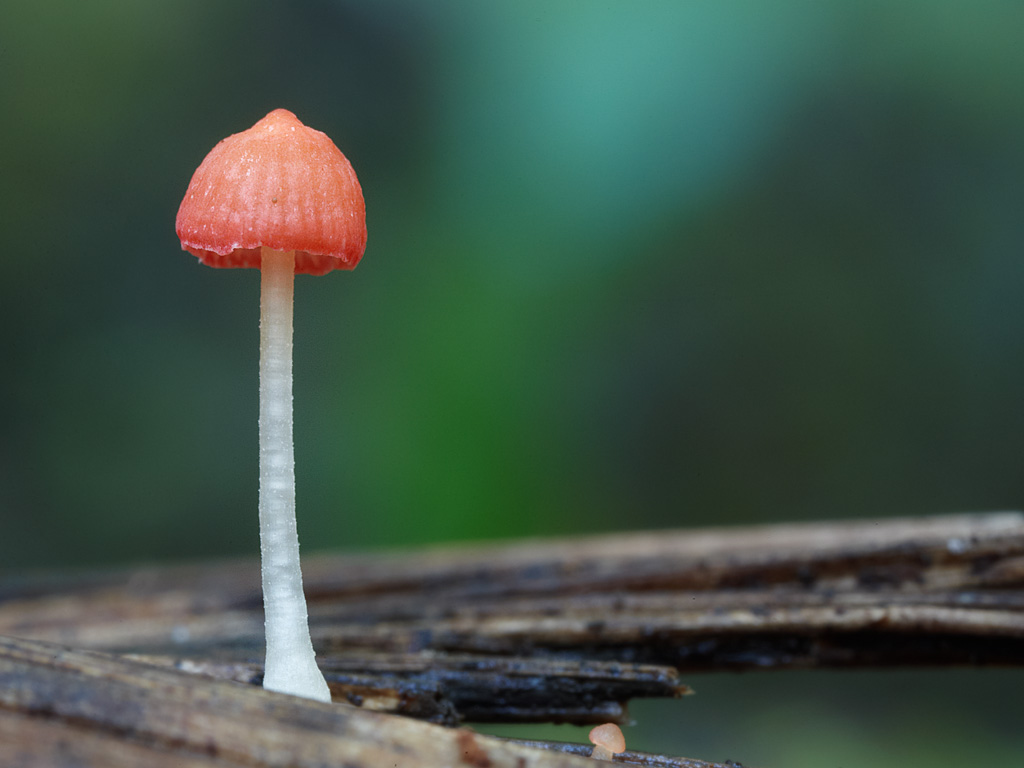
- Atheniella adonis

Scientific classification
- Kingdom: Fungi
- Division: Basidiomycota
- Class: Agaricomycetes
- Order: Agaricales
- Family: Cyphellaceae
- Genus: Atheniella; Redhead, Moncalvo, Vilgalys, Desjardin, B.A.Perry (2012)

Type species
- Atheniella adonis (Bull.) Redhead, Moncalvo, Vilgalys, Desjardin, B.A.Perry (2012)

Species
- Atheniella adonis Atheniella amabillissima Atheniella aurantiidisca Atheniella flavoalba Atheniella leptophylla

= Atheniella =

Genus of fungi

Atheniella is an agaric fungal genus that produces mostly brightly colored (yellow, pink, orange, or red) mycenoid fruit bodies on small plant debris on forest floors, in fields and bogs. It is not a member of the Mycenaceae, and unlike most Mycenaceae, its basidiospores and tissues do not react with iodine. Atheniella species were most recently classified in Mycena because of their stature. However, they lack amyloid spores and tissues bewildering taxonomists, leading to temporary placements in Hemimycena and Marasmiellus before being phylogenetically excluded from both genera and the Mycenaceae. Most recently the genus has been classified in the Porotheleaceae. Currently 12 species are recognized.

== Etymology ==
The name Atheniella alludes to Greek goddess Athena due to her connection to Mycenaean Greece. Mycena is a closely related genus.

== See also ==
- Athene, another genus named after Athena
