= Solomons boobook =

The Solomons boobook has been split into the following species:

- West Solomons owl, Athene jacquinoti
- Guadalcanal owl, Athene granti
- Malaita owl, Athene malaitae
- Makira owl, Athene roseoaxillaris
