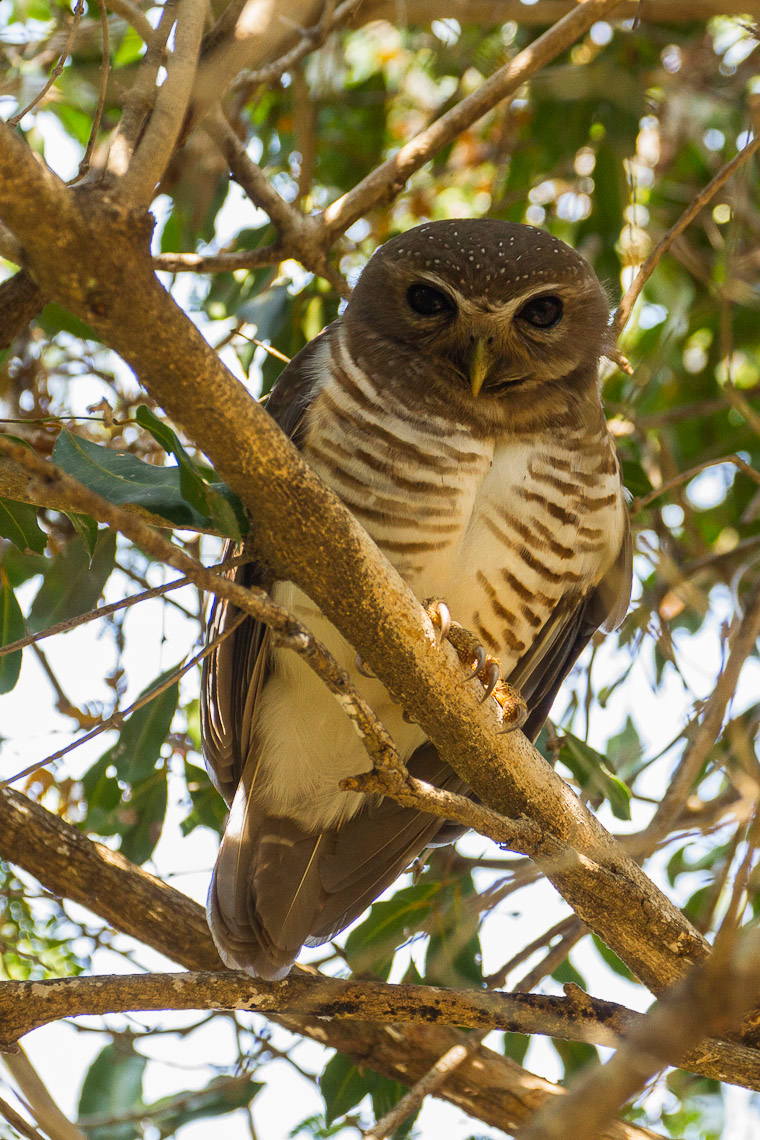

Conservation status
- Least Concern (IUCN 3.1)
- CITES Appendix II

Scientific classification
- Kingdom: Animalia
- Phylum: Chordata
- Class: Aves
- Order: Strigiformes
- Family: Strigidae
- Genus: Athene
- Species: A. superciliaris

Binomial name
- Athene superciliaris (Vieillot, 1817)

Synonyms
- Ninox superciliaris (Vieillot, 1817); Strix superciliaris, Vieillot, 1817

= White-browed owl =

Species of owl

The white-browed owl (Athene superciliaris), also known as the white-browed hawk-owl or the Madagascar hawk-owl, is a species of owl in the family Strigidae. It is endemic to Madagascar.

== Taxonomy ==
The white-browed owl was formerly placed in the genus Ninox but recent genetic data has led to it being moved to the genus Athene.

== Description ==
White-browed owl gives food to mate at the Berenty Reserve in 2003

The white-browed owl is a dumpy owl with a large, rounded head which does not have ear tufts. The adults have brown upperparts with white spotting on the crown, mantle and wing coverts and a grey-brown facial disc with bold white eyebrows and a buff chin. The underparts are buff, broadly barred with dark brown. The underwings, vent and legs are plain, pale buff and the tail is plain brown. The bill and cere are horn-coloured, the eyes are dark brown and legs and feet are pale yellow. The length is about 25 cm (9.8 in) and the wingspan is about 70 cm (28 in).

=== Voice ===
The song is a howling "woohoo" made at intervals, beginning quite hoarsely. Another call is a loud "kuang", louder and higher pitched at its start, which may be an aggression call.

== Distribution and habitat ==
The white-browed owl is endemic to Madagascar where it is found in the northeast, the south and the southwest.

It is commonest in the drier forests and gallery forests of the south and west of Madagascar, and rather less common in the humid rainforest in the northeast. It also occurs in cultivated areas and secondary forest. It is found mainly in the lowlands, with an upper limit of 800 m (2,600 ft) above sea level.

== Behaviour ==
The white-browed owl nests from October to December and the nest is a shallow scrape in the ground in which 3-5 white eggs are laid. The breeding behaviour is little known. It is a strictly nocturnal species which feeds mainly on insects and small vertebrates which are caught from a perch. It may also hawk insects and bats in flight.
