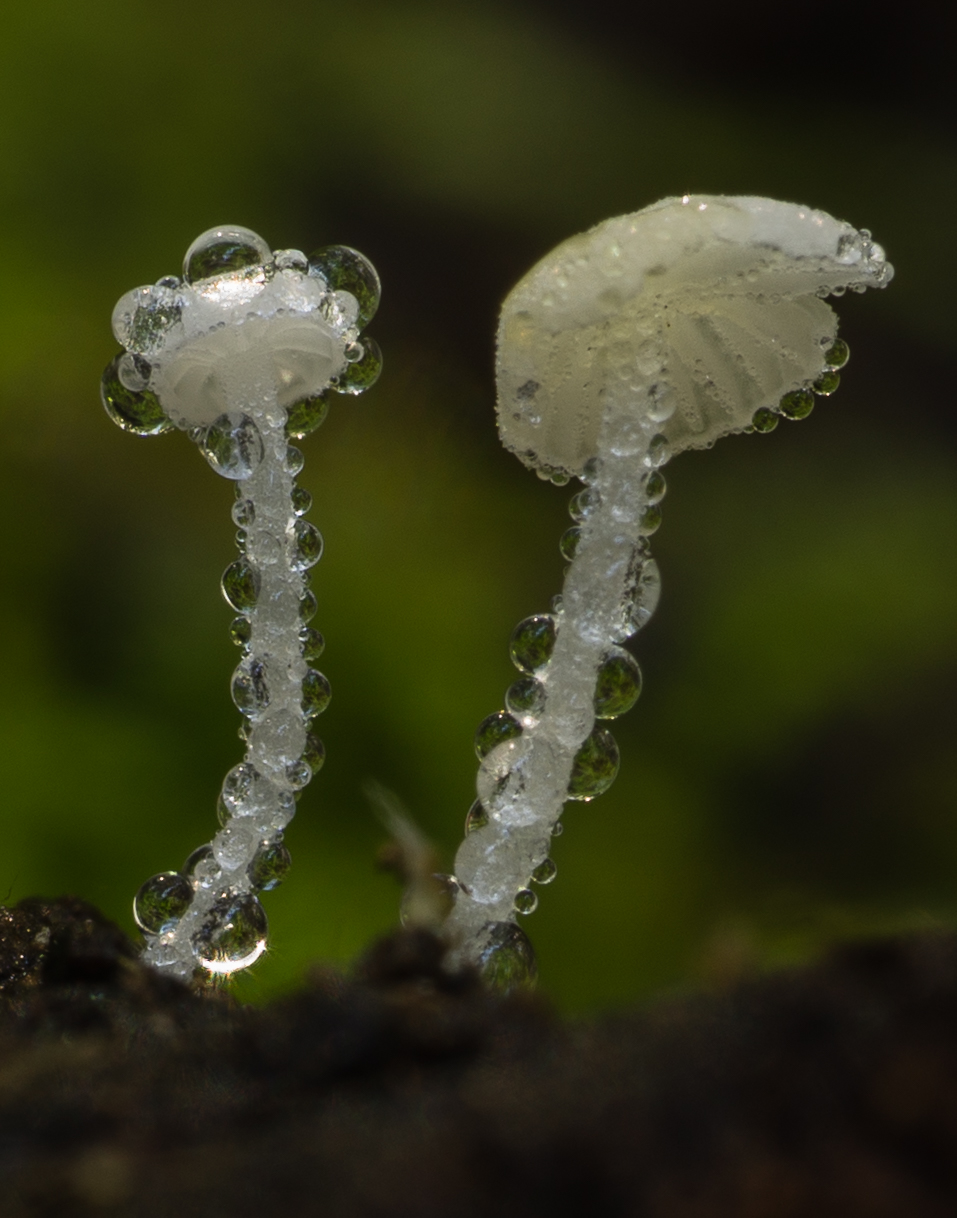

Scientific classification
- Domain: Eukaryota
- Kingdom: Fungi
- Division: Basidiomycota
- Class: Agaricomycetes
- Order: Agaricales
- Family: Mycenaceae
- Genus: Hemimycena
- Species: H. cephalotricha

Binomial name
- Hemimycena cephalotricha (Joss. ex Redhead) Singer (1986)

Synonyms
- Delicautla cephalotricha Cejp (1938); Helotium cephalotrichum Joss. ex Redhead (1982); Hemimycena cephalotricha Singer (1938); Marasmiellus cephalotrichs Singer (1951); Mycena cephalotricha Kühner (1938); Omphalia cephalotricha Joss. (1937)

= Hemimycena cephalotricha =

Species of fungus

Hemimycena cephalotricha is a species of basidiomycete fungus of the family Mycenaceae, of the order Agaricales.

It is native to the southwest of Western Australia.
