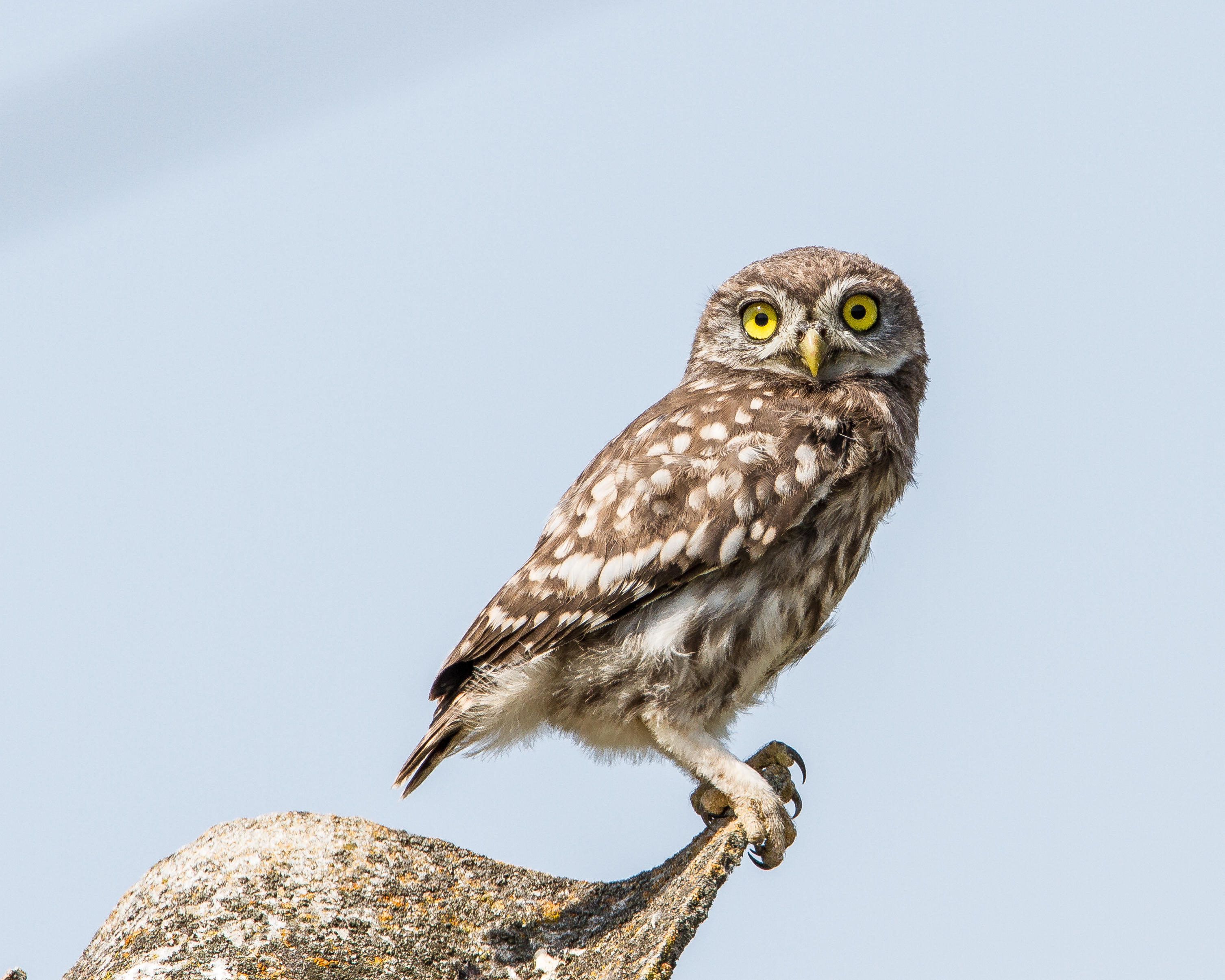
- Little owl, Athene noctua

Scientific classification
- Kingdom: Animalia
- Phylum: Chordata
- Class: Aves
- Order: Strigiformes
- Family: Strigidae
- Genus: Athene; F. Boie, 1822

Type species
- Strix noctua Scopoli, 1769

Species
- Athene blewitti; Athene brama; Athene cunicularia; Athene noctua; Athene superciliaris; Athene jacquinoti; Athene granti; Athene malaitae; Athene roseoaxillaris

Synonyms
- Heteroglaux; Speotyto; Spheotyto (lapsus)

= Athene (bird) =

Athene Temporal range: Late Miocene to recent

Genus of birds

Athene is a genus of owls, containing nine living species, depending on classification. These birds are small, with brown and white speckles, yellow eyes, and white eyebrows. This genus is found on all continents except for Australia, Antarctica, and Sub-Saharan Africa. An evolutionary radiation of four species (formerly thought to be in the genus Ninox) is also present in the Solomon Islands.

== Taxonomy and list of species ==
The genus Athene was introduced by the German zoologist Friedrich Boie in 1822. The type species was designated as the little owl (Athene noctua) by the English zoologist George Robert Gray in 1841. The genus name is from the little owl which was closely associated with the Greek goddess Athena, and often depicted with her. Her original role as a goddess of the night might explain the link to an owl.

The genus contains the following nine species.

Image	Scientific name	Common name	Distribution
	Athene noctua	Little owl	Europe, Asia east to Korea and North Africa
	Athene brama	Spotted owlet	tropical Asia from mainland India to Southeast Asia
	Athene cunicularia	Burrowing owl	North and South America
	Athene superciliaris	White-browed owl	Madagascar
	Athene blewitti	Forest owlet	central India
	Athene jacquinoti	West Solomons owl	western Solomon Islands
	Athene granti	Guadalcanal owl	Guadalcanal Island, Solomon Islands
	Athene malaitae	Malaita owl	Malaita Island, Solomon Islands
	Athene roseoaxillaris	Makira owl	Bauro and Makira Islands, Solomon Islands

The forest owlet was formerly placed in the monotypic genus Heteroglaux, and the Solomon Islands radiation was formerly placed in the genus Ninox with the other owls referred to as "boobooks" until taxonomic studies found them to group in Athene.

== Extinct species and subspecies ==
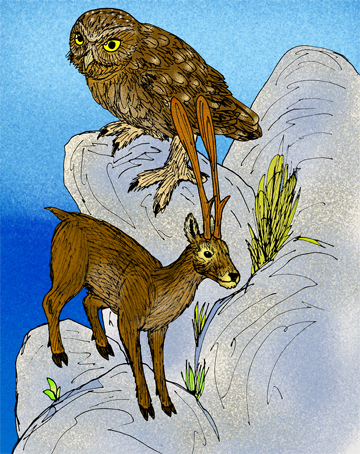
Cretan owl with Candiacervus ropalophorus

A number of mainly island representatives of this genus are only known from fossil or subfossil remains:

- Athene megalopeza (fossil; Rexroad Late Pliocene of west-central U.S.)—sometimes placed in Speotyto
- Athene veta (fossil; Early Pleistocene of Rebielice, Poland)
- Athene angelis (fossil; Middle–Late Pleistocene of Castiglione, Corsica)
- Athene trinacriae (Pleistocene)
- Athene cf. cunicularia (fossil; Pleistocene of Barbuda, West Indies)—sometimes placed in Speotyto
- Athene cf. cunicularia (fossil; Pleistocene of the Cayman Islands, West Indies)—sometimes placed in Speotyto
- Athene cf. cunicularia (fossil; Pleistocene of Jamaica, West Indies)—sometimes placed in Speotyto
- Athene cf. cunicularia (fossil; Pleistocene of Mona Island, West Indies)—sometimes placed in Speotyto
- Athene cf. cunicularia (fossil; Pleistocene of Puerto Rico, West Indies)—sometimes placed in Speotyto
- Cretan owl (Athene cretensis) (prehistoric; Crete, Mediterranean)

The Cretan owl was a flightless or near-flightless form that was more than 50 cm (almost 2 ft) tall. It went extinct soon after the island of Crete became inhabited by humans.

Late Miocene (about 11 mya) fossil remains from Rudabánya (NE Hungary) have been tentatively assigned to this genus. Considering the known fossil range of Athene and the misassignments of many Miocene strigids from Europe, it may be a basal member of the present genus or not belong here at all. The supposed species "Athene" murivora was the name given to subfossil bones of male Rodrigues scops owls.

  - Antiguan burrowing owl (Athene cunicularia amaura)—extinct (c. 1905)
  - Guadeloupe burrowing owl (Athene cunicularia guadeloupensis)—extinct (c. 1890)

== See also ==
- Atheniella, another genus named after Athena
