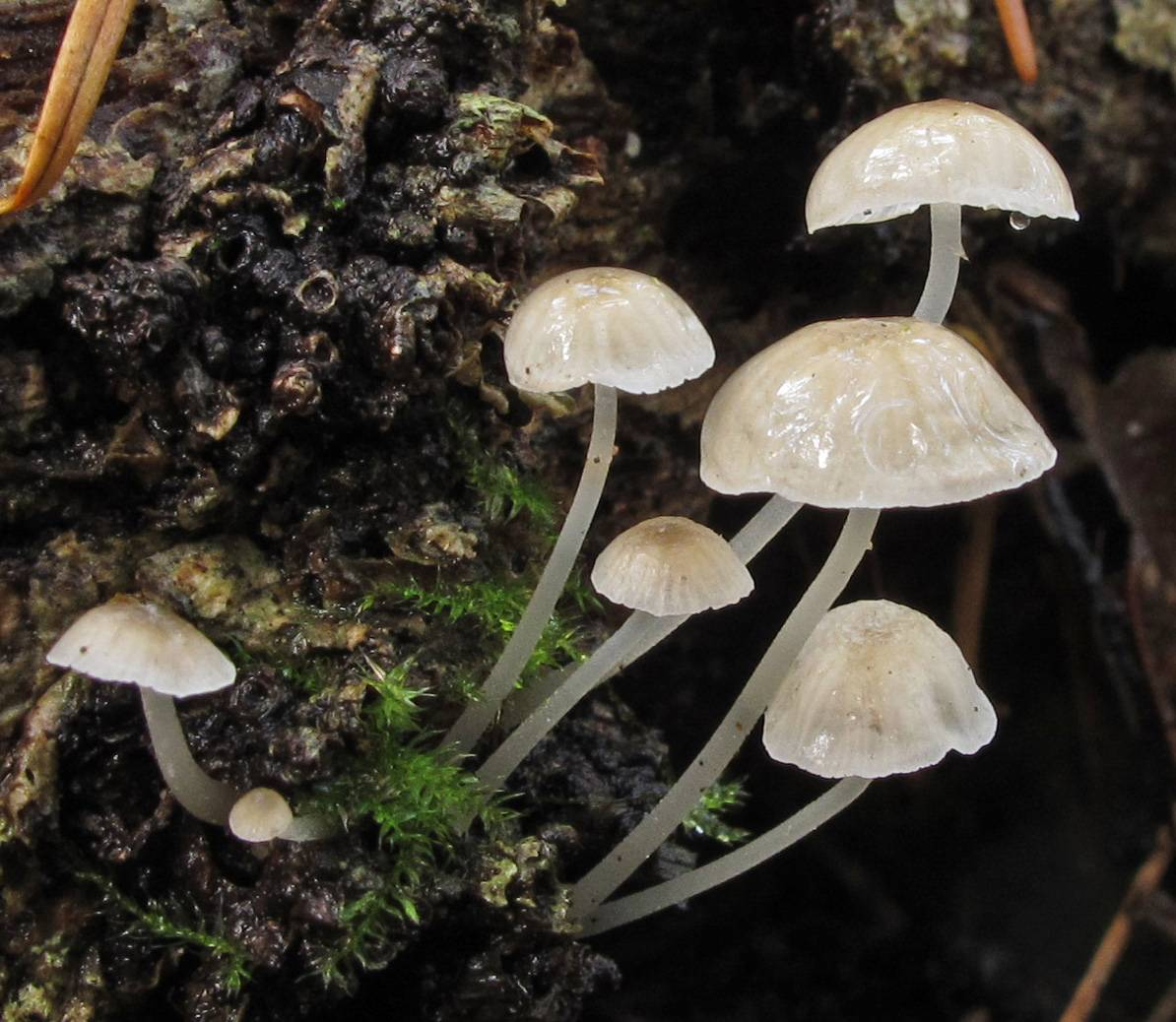

Scientific classification
- Kingdom: Fungi
- Division: Basidiomycota
- Class: Agaricomycetes
- Order: Agaricales
- Family: Porotheleaceae
- Genus: Phloeomana
- Species: P. speirea

Binomial name
- Phloeomana speirea (Fr.) Redhead (2013)

Synonyms
- Agaricus speireus Fr. (1815); Agaricus camptophyllus Berk. (1836); Omphalia speirea (Fr.) Quél. [as 'speireus'] (1872); Mycena speirea (Fr.) Gillet (1874); Omphalia camptophylla (Berk.) Sacc. (1887); Omphalia tenuistipes J.E.Lange (1930); Omphalia speirea var. tenuistipes J.E.Lange (1936); Hemimycena speirea (Fr.) Singer (1938); Mycena speirea f. camptophylla (Berk.) Kühner (1938); Marasmiellus camptophyllus (Berk.) Singer (1951) [1949]; Mycena camptophylla (Berk.) Singer (1962) [1961]; Mycena speirea var. camptophylla (Berk.) Courtec. (1986)

= Phloeomana speirea =

Species of fungus

Phloeomana speirea, commonly known as the bark bonnet, is a species of fungus in the family Porotheleaceae. It is a bark-inhabiting agaric that produces fuscous-colored to whitish mycenoid to omphalinoid fruit bodies in temperate forests. The fungus was first described to science as Agaricus speireus by Elias Fries in 1815. Scott Redhead transferred it to the new genus Phloeomana in 2013, in which it is the type species.
