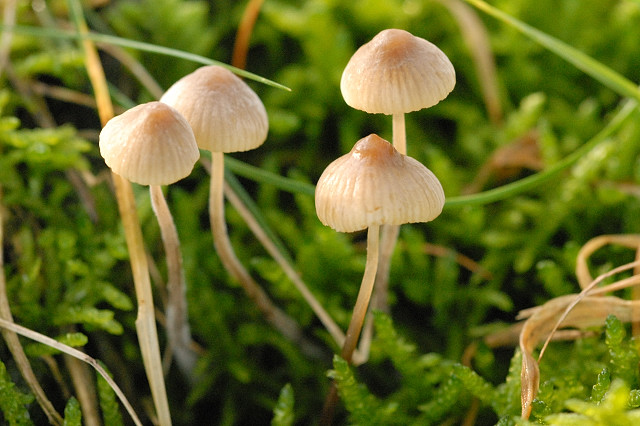

Scientific classification
- Domain: Eukaryota
- Kingdom: Fungi
- Division: Basidiomycota
- Class: Agaricomycetes
- Order: Agaricales
- Family: Cyphellaceae
- Genus: Atheniella
- Species: A. flavoalba

Binomial name
- Atheniella flavoalba (Fr.) Redhead, Moncalvo, Vilgalys, Desjardin & B.A. Perry (2012)

Synonyms
- Agaricus flavoalbus Fr. Agaricus luteoalbus Bolton; Hemimycena flavoalba (Fr.) Singer; Marasmiellus flavoalbus (Fr.) Singer; Mycena flavoalba (Fr.) Quél. Mycena luteoalba (Bolton) Gray

= Atheniella flavoalba =

Species of fungus

Atheniella flavoalba Mycological characteristics
- Gills on hymenium
- Cap is conical
- Hymenium is adnate
- Stipe is bare
- Spore print is white
- Ecology is saprotrophic
- Edibility is inedible

Atheniella flavoalba, which has the recommended name of ivory bonnet in the UK, is a species of agaric in the family Cyphellaceae. The cap is initially conical, before becoming convex and then flat; it may reach up to 1.5 cm (0.6 in) across. The cap is ivory-white to yellowish white, sometimes more yellowish at the center. The tubular stems are up to 8 cm (3.1 in) long and 2.5 mm (0.10 in) thick, and have long, coarse white hairs at their bases. Atheniella flavoalba is found in Europe, the Middle East, and North America, where it grows scattered in pastures or in dense groups under conifers and on humus in oak woods.

== Taxonomy ==
First described as Agaricus flavoalbus by Swedish mycologist Elias Magnus Fries in 1838, the species was assigned to the genus Mycena in 1872 by Lucien Quélet, though its inamyloid basidiospores and non-dextrinoid hyphae are anomalous for this genus. American mycologist Rolf Singer transferred the species to the genera Hemimycena and Marasmiellus in 1938 and 1951, respectively. Singer later changed his mind about these placements, and in his 1986 Agaricales in Modern Taxonomy he considered the species a Mycena. In the standard 2016 European monograph, the species is noted as "not a proper Mycena", but retained within the genus pending further research.

Recent molecular research, based on cladistic analysis of DNA sequences, has shown that the species is not closely related to Mycena and belongs in the Cyphellaceae in the genus Atheniella.

=== Etymology ===
The specific epithet flavoalba ("yellow-white") is a compound of the Latin adjectives flavus ("yellow) and alba ("white").

== Description ==
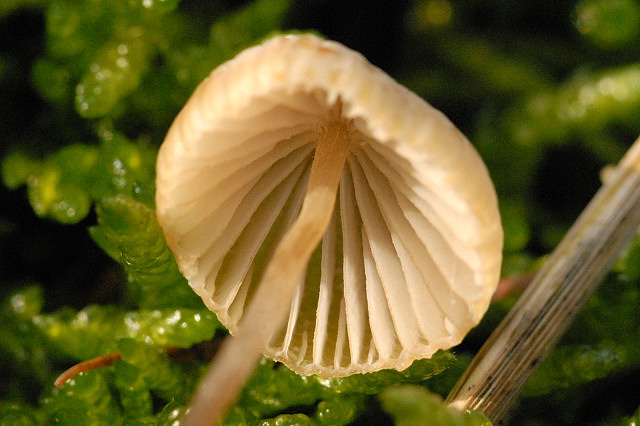
The whitish to creamy white gills are waxy in appearance and consistency.

The cap of A. flavoalba is 1–2 cm (0.4–0.8 in) in diameter, conical when young, becoming somewhat bell-shaped, broadly conic or at times nearly convex. It may develop a papilla (a nipple-like structure) in its center. The cap margin is initially pressed against the stem, but in maturity either flares out or curves inward slightly. The cap surface is smooth, moist, and partially translucent, so that the outline of the gills underneath the cap may be seen. The mushroom is hygrophanous (changing color as it loses or gains moisture), being cream-buff to yellowish initially, with a paler (almost white) margin, and fading to buff in the center and yellowish-white along the margin when dry. The flesh is yellowish to white, thick under the disc but otherwise thin, moderately fragile, and without any distinctive odor and taste.

The gills are ascending and somewhat hooked or toothed, narrow at first but becoming rather broad (2.5 mm and becoming 3–4 mm). They are nearly equal in width throughout or slightly ventricose in age, with a spacing that is close to subdistant. About 18–24 gills reach the stem, with two tiers of lamellulae (short gills that do not extend fully from the cap margin to the stem) that may develop veins running between them. The gills are white to creamy-white with edges that are even and whitish, and waxy in appearance and consistency. The stem is 3–8 cm (1.2–3.1 in) long, 1–2.5 mm (0.04–0.10 in) thick, equal, tubular, somewhat elastic, cartilaginous, and not particularly fragile. The base of the stem is either strigose (covered with sharp, straight, stiff white hairs) or surrounded with a matted white mycelium. Above the base, the stem is smooth, and pruinose toward the apex. When moist it is translucent with slight ripples running transversely, and white to pale yellow.

=== Microscopic characteristics ===
The spores are 7–9 by 3–4.5 μm, ellipsoid, and nonamyloid. The basidia (spore-bearing cells) are four-spored. The pleurocystidia and cheilocystidia (cystidia found on the face and edge of a gill, respectively) are similar in structure and abundant, ventricose with long, rather narrow necks, and measure 46–62 by 9–14 μm. The neck is often encrusted with a mucilaginous substance, but it is otherwise smooth and hyaline. The flesh of the gill is homogeneous, and stains pale yellow in iodine. The flesh of the cap has a thin, poorly differentiated pellicle (a thin membrane), a somewhat differentiated hypoderm (that is most pronounced in old caps) and the remainder is made up of somewhat enlarged cells that stain pale yellow in iodine.

=== Similar species ===
Atheniella flavoalba resembles some members of the genus Hemimycena, such as H. lactea and H. delectabilis. It can be distinguished from these species by its white to yellowish cap, and differences in the shape of both its spores and caulocystidia (cystidia on the stem). H. conidiogena, a Spanish species described in 2005, is also similar in appearance, but differs in the distribution of pigment in the cap, and the differential staining in response to the dye cresyl blue—A. flavoalba is positive, while H. conidiogena is negative.

== Habitat and distribution ==
The fruit bodies of Atheniella flavoalba grow scattered to densely gregarious in mossy pastures, needle beds under conifers, or on humus in oak woods during the autumn. The species is common in old grassland in Europe, but less common in North America though sometimes occurring in large quantities in certain localities. In the United States, it has been collected from Colorado, Idaho, Michigan, North Carolina, Oregon, Washington, Wyoming, Florida, and Kansas. It is also found in Israel. The species is listed as "Least Concern" in the Danish Red Data Book. Atheniella flavoalba is considered inedible.
