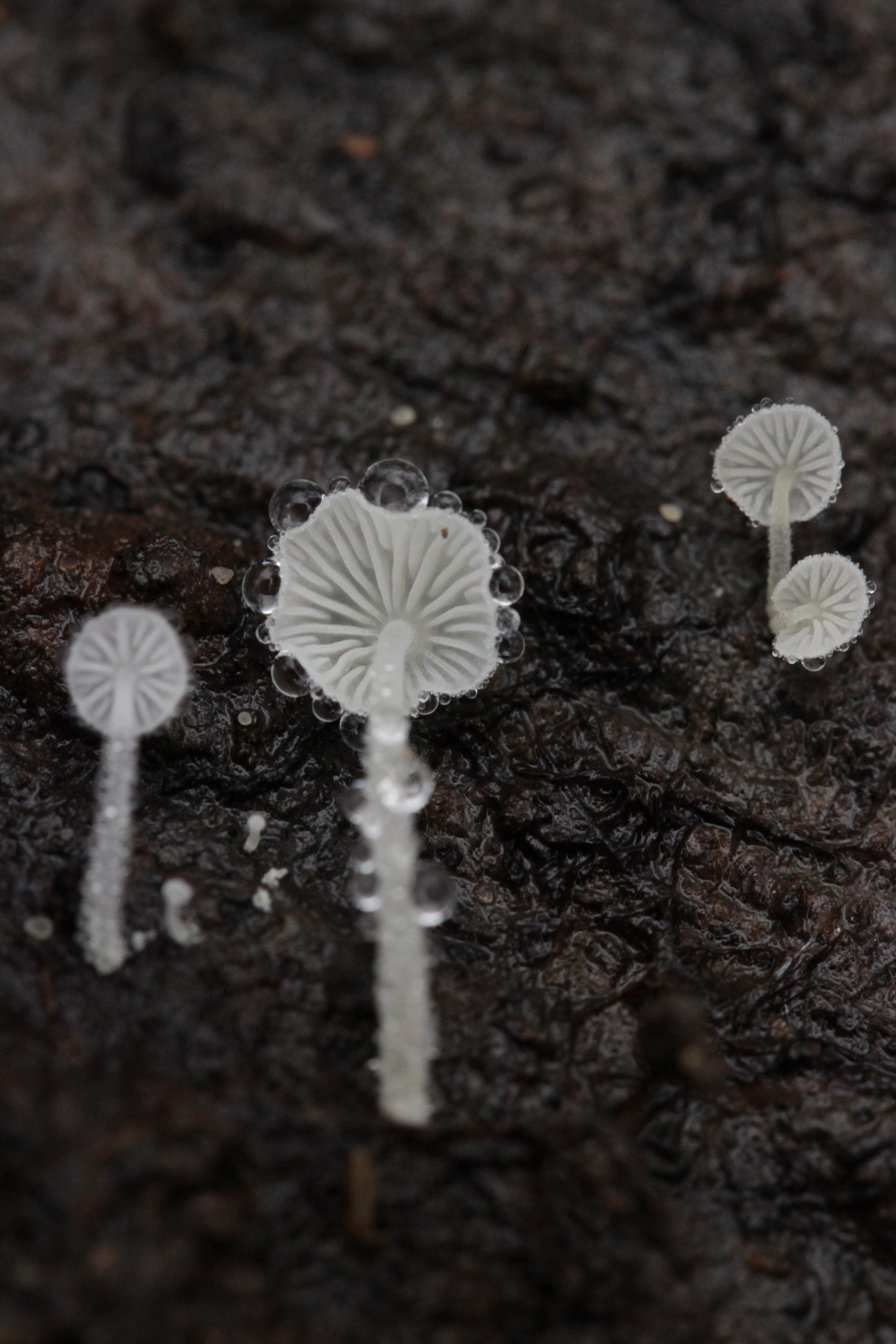

Scientific classification
- Kingdom: Fungi
- Division: Basidiomycota
- Class: Agaricomycetes
- Order: Agaricales
- Family: Mycenaceae
- Genus: Hemimycena
- Species: H. tortuosa

Binomial name
- Hemimycena tortuosa (P.D.Orton) Redhead (1980)

= Hemimycena tortuosa =

Fungus species

Hemimycena tortuosa, commonly known as the dewdrop bonnet, is a species of basidiomycete fungus of the family Mycenaceae, in the order Agaricales.

== Synonyms ==
- Helotium tortuosum (P.D.Orton) Redhead
- Mycena tortuosa P.D.Orton 1960
