= Guadalcanal owl =

Conservation status
- Near Threatened (IUCN 3.1)
- CITES Appendix II

Scientific classification
- Kingdom: Animalia
- Phylum: Chordata
- Class: Aves
- Order: Strigiformes
- Family: Strigidae
- Genus: Athene
- Species: A. granti

Binomial name
- Athene granti (Sharpe, 1888)
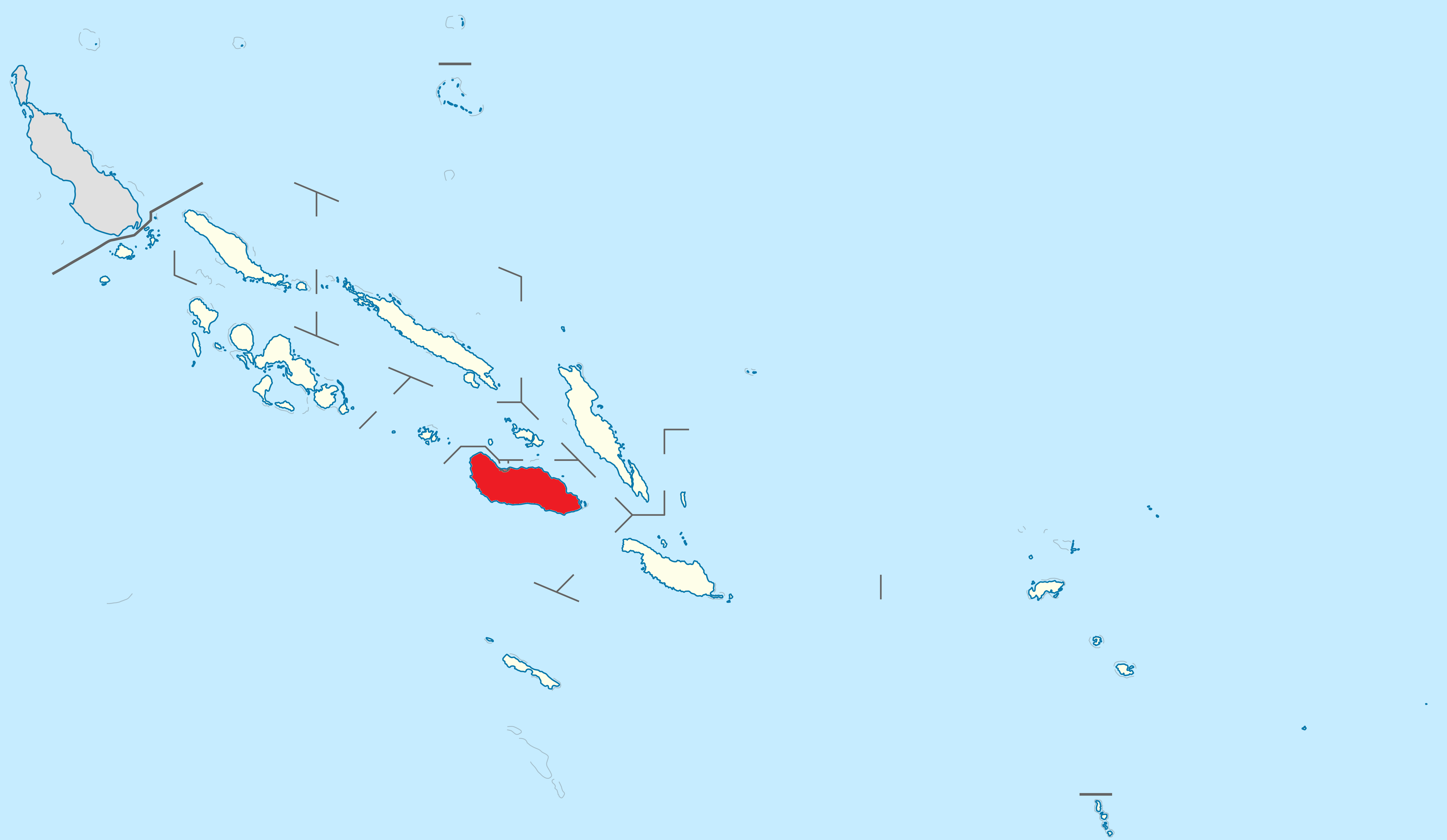

Synonyms
- Ninox granti

Species of owl

The Guadalcanal owl (Athene granti), also known as the Guadalcanal boobook, is a small to medium-sized owl. It is endemic to Guadalcanal. It was formerly considered a subspecies of the Solomons boobook.
