= Malaita owl =

Malaita boobook

Conservation status
- Vulnerable (IUCN 3.1)
- CITES Appendix II

Scientific classification
- Kingdom: Animalia
- Phylum: Chordata
- Class: Aves
- Order: Strigiformes
- Family: Strigidae
- Genus: Athene
- Species: A. malaitae

Binomial name
- Athene malaitae (Mayr, 1931)

Synonyms
- Ninox malaitae

Species of owl

The Malaita owl (Athene malaitae), also known as the Malaita boobook, is a small to medium-sized owl. It is endemic to Malaita. It was formerly considered a subspecies of the Solomons boobook.
