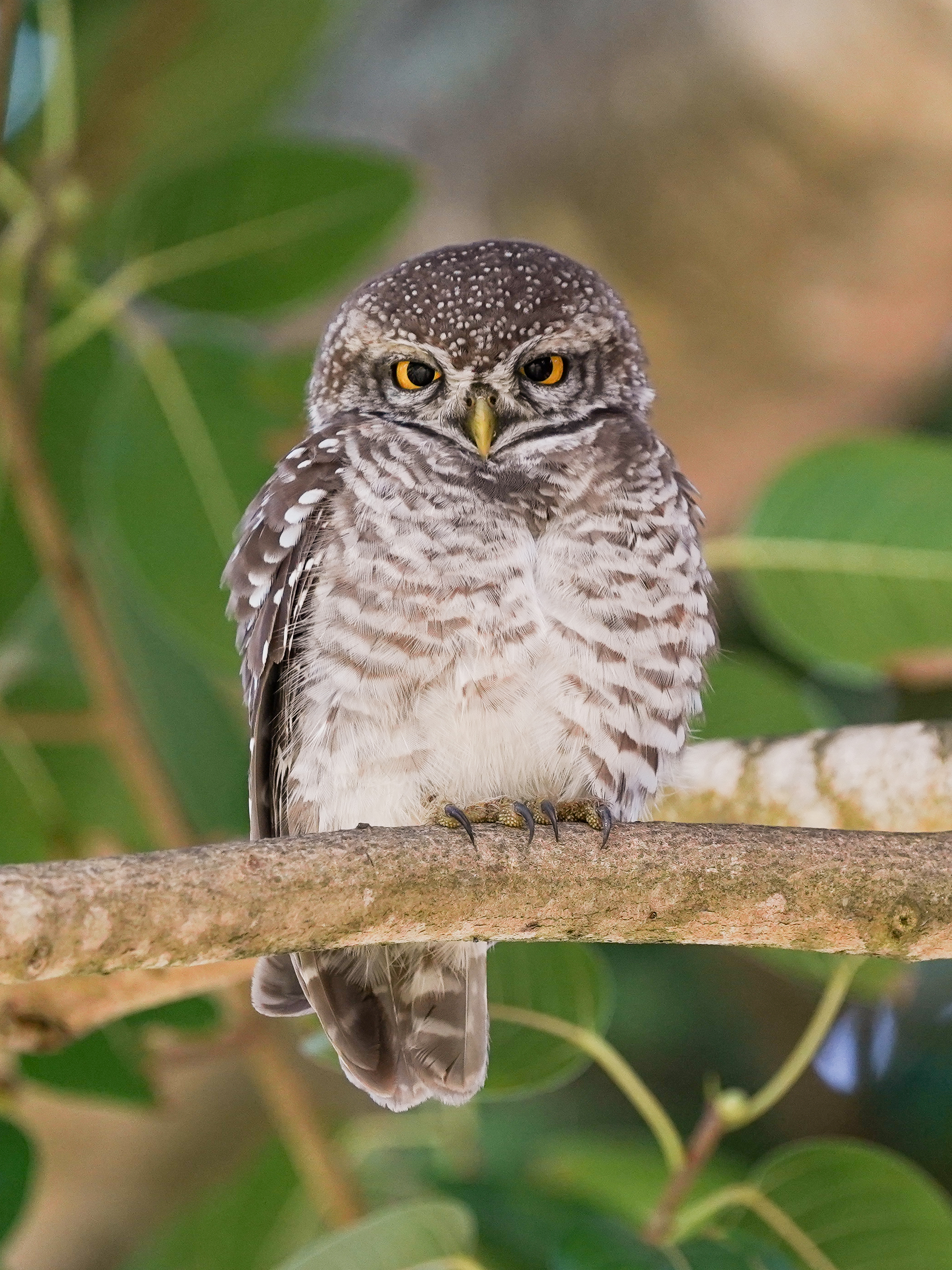
- A. b. indica India
- A pair calling in Pune

Conservation status
- Least Concern (IUCN 3.1)
- CITES Appendix II

Scientific classification
- Kingdom: Animalia
- Phylum: Chordata
- Class: Aves
- Order: Strigiformes
- Family: Strigidae
- Genus: Athene
- Species: A. brama

Binomial name
- Athene brama (Temminck, 1821)

Synonyms
- Carine brama Noctua indica Franklin, 1831

= Spotted owlet =

Species of owl

The spotted owlet (Athene brama) is a small owl which breeds in tropical Asia from North Pakistan to Southeast Asia. A common resident of open habitats including farmland and human habitation, it has adapted to living in cities. They roost in small groups in the hollows of trees or in cavities in rocks and buildings. It nests in a hole in a tree or building, laying 3–5 eggs. The species shows great variation including clinal variation in size and forms a superspecies with the very similar little owl.

== Description ==
The spotted owlet is a small and stocky bird, barely 21 cm (8.3 in) in size. The upperparts are grey-brown, heavily spotted with white. The underparts are white, streaked with brown. The facial disc is pale and the iris is yellow. There is a white neckband and supercilium. Sexes are similar. The flight is deeply undulating. The nominate form is darker than the paler forms such as indica of drier regions.

== Taxonomy ==
Early workers sometimes treated members of this species group as subspecies of Athene noctua. The two have been separated but they are considered to form a superspecies complex. Several subspecies have been described and about four or five are widely accepted (the race poikila is invalid and refers to Aegolius funereus; A. b. fryi of southern India described by Stuart Baker and A. b. mayri described by Deignan from northern Thailand are not usually recognized.) The five widely recognized subspecies are albida Koelz, 1950 of western Asia in Iran and Pakistan; indica (Franklin, 1831) of northern India; brama (Temminck, 1821) of southern India which is darker than indica; ultra Ripley, 1948 (not always recognized) of northeastern India is said to have white spots on the mantle and "higher pitched calls"; and pulchra Hume, 1873 of Southeast Asia from Myanmar and Thailand extending into Cambodia and Vietnam. The northern and southern Indian populations intergrade and there is no dividing boundary. The northern indica populations have the upperparts brownish. Size decreases from north to south. The species is not found in Sri Lanka, although birds on the Indian mainland are found even at the tip of Rameshwaram.

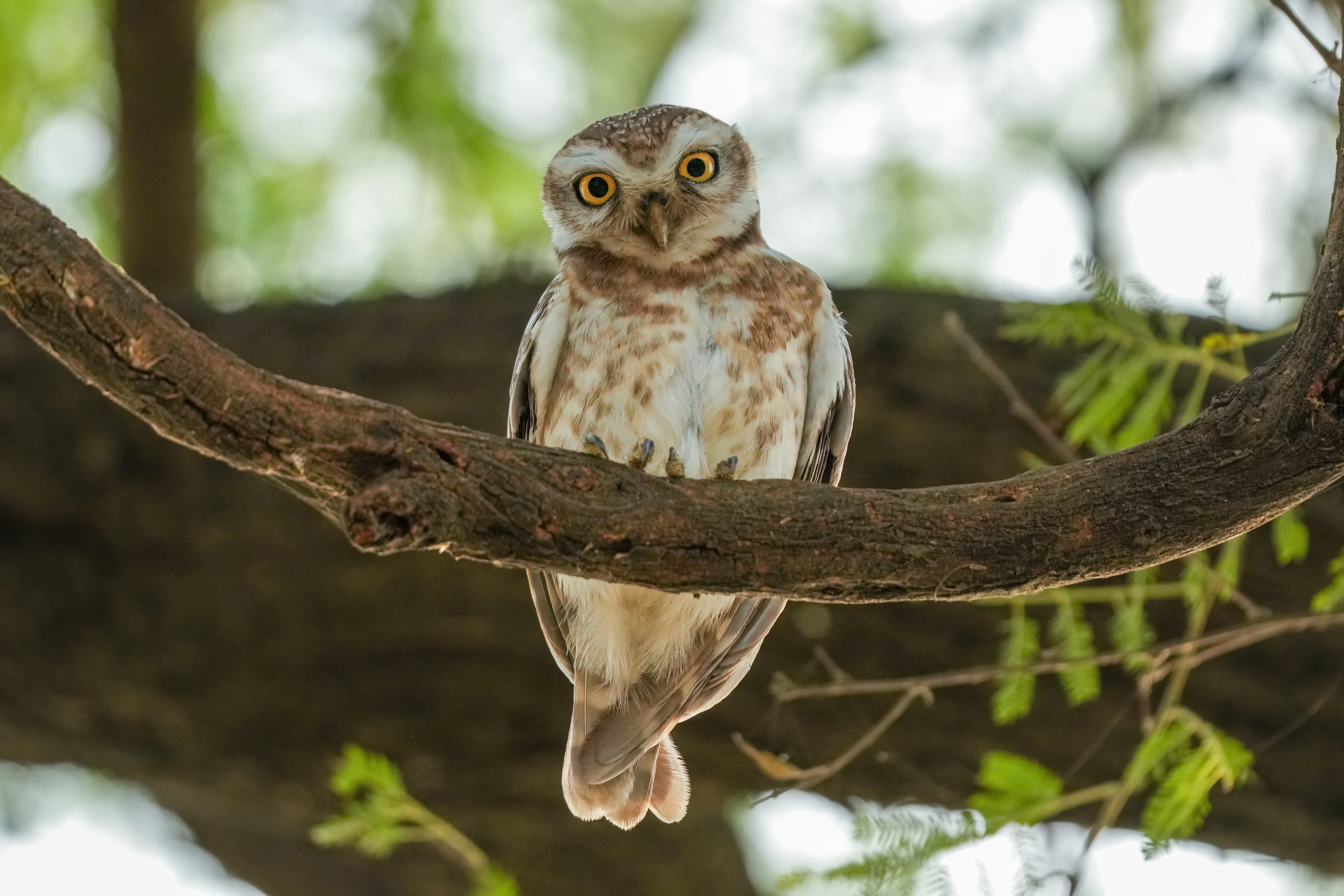
A. b. indica at Keoladeo National Park, India

== Ecology ==
=== Behavior ===
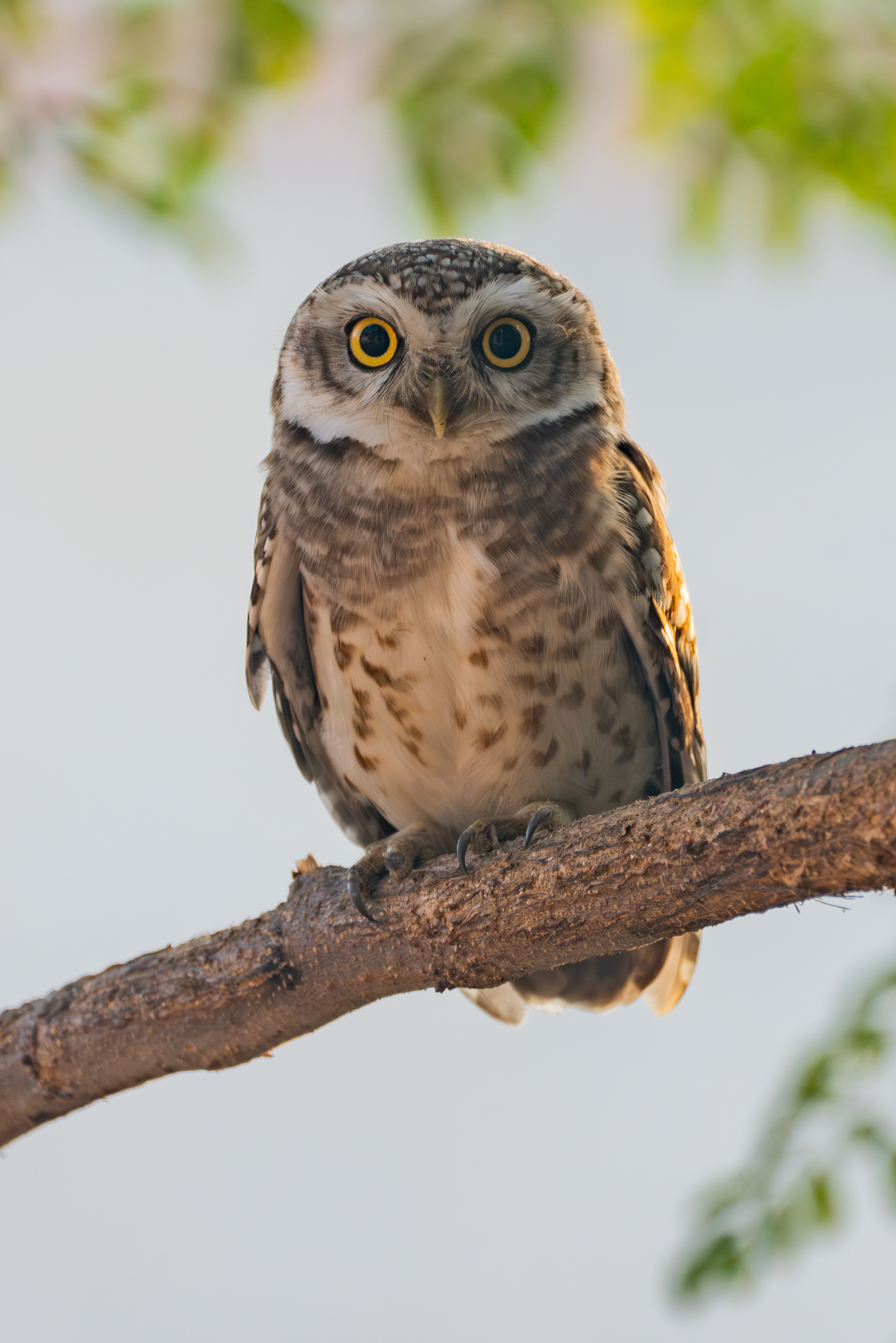
Spotted owlet in Patiala, India at noon in March 2023

This species is nocturnal but is often seen during the day. When disturbed from their daytime site, they bob their head and stare at intruders. Their presence can often be located by the small birds that mob the owlets while they are perching in a tree during daytime.The call is a harsh and loud churring and chuckling chirurr-chirurr-chirurr ending with a chirwak-chirwak and they call mainly during early dawn or just after sunset. The brain has a pineal gland, formerly thought to be absent in the owls. Birds show variation in the melatonin concentration between day and night. A high melatonin level is associated with sleep and low levels are associated with high alertness and foraging activity. Spotted owlets, however, show only a slightly lower melatonin concentration at night with a slight increase in the early afternoon. Other owls such as the barn owl show little day-night variation. Seasonal changes in glandular activity have been associated with environmental factors such as temperature and humidity.

=== Feeding ===
They hunt a variety of insects and small vertebrates. In Pakistan they have been found to take mostly insect prey. In the arid region of Jodhpur, they have been found to take more rodents (especially in the genus Mus and tend to avoid other rodents such as Tatera) prior to the breeding season. Bats, toads, small snakes such as Ramphotyphlops braminus have been noted. They may also take scorpions and molluscs. Nests near human habitations may show higher breeding success due to the increased availability of rodents for feeding young.

=== Breeding ===
The breeding season is November to April. Courtship behaviour includes bill grasping, allopreening and ritual feeding. The female may call with the male, bob head and deflect its tail in invitation. The social organization of family groups is not clear and multiple males may copulate with a female and females may attempt pseudocopulation, possibly a kind of displacement behaviour. They nest in cavities often competing with other hole-nesters such as mynas, rollers and parakeets. They may also nest in holes in vertical embankments. The nest may be lined with leaves and feathers or may use the existing lining from a prior occupant. The typical clutch is made up of three or four spherical white eggs (30.9mm long and 26.3 mm wide, 11.6g) and incubation begins with the first laid eggs leading to a wide variation in the size of the chicks. The young are fed initially on insects such as cockroaches and later fed small vertebrate prey such as mice (a toad Bufo stomaticus has been noted in Gujarat). The chicks gain weight during the early stages but lose weight before fledging. Only one or two chicks may fledge and they leave the nest in about a month.

=== Parasites ===
A coccidian parasite, Eimeria atheni, has been described from this species. An ectoparasitic mite, Neocheletiella athene, has been described from a specimen from the Antwerp zoo. Bird lice of the species Colpocephalum pectinatum are known to be ectoparasites. The Acanthocephalan parasite Apororhynchus chauhani was discovered in the intestine of the spotted owlet.

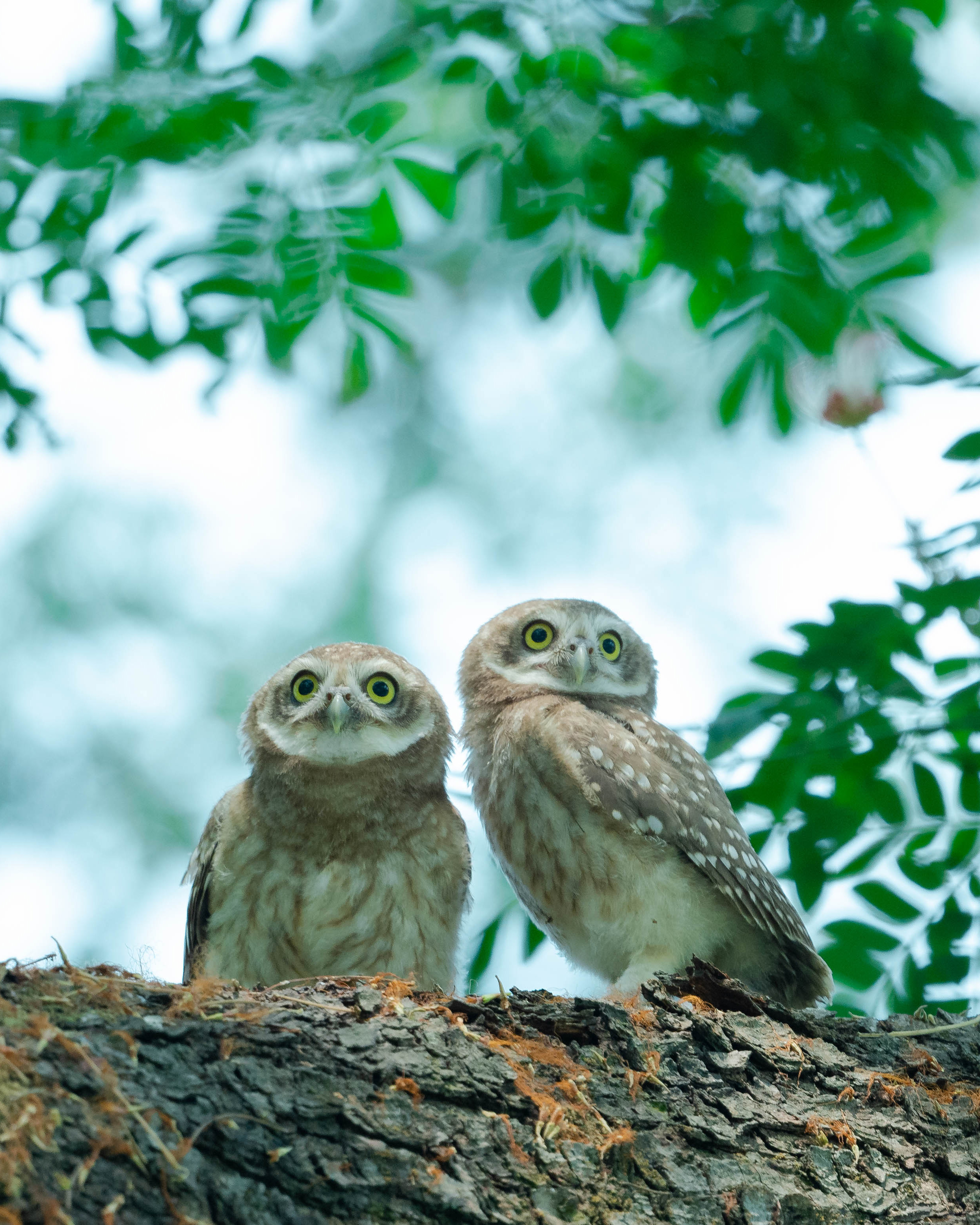
Spotted owlet pair

== In culture ==
These birds, being very familiar to humans especially with their loud calling, have been associated with bad omens. Although, such associations with bad omens are just folklore and there is nothing scientific attributable to such claims. In modern times, such superstitions are no longer believed in. The species name brama is from the French name Chouette brame and indirectly refers to this owl's Indian habitat by way of homage to Brahma, the Hindu supreme spirit. Furthermore, the scientific name Athene Brama is often said to be sourced from the two words Athene: Named after the Greek goddess of wisdom, whose sacred bird was the owl; and Brama: Derived as a homage to Lord Brahma, the Hindu creator god, to reflect the species' wide presence across India.

Furthermore, in Hindu mythology, the owl is primarily recognized as the vahana (vehicle or mount) of Goddess Lakshmi, symbolizing wisdom, patience, and the ability to perceive inner truth amidst material prosperity.
