= Makira owl =

Conservation status
- Vulnerable (IUCN 3.1)
- CITES Appendix II

Scientific classification
- Kingdom: Animalia
- Phylum: Chordata
- Class: Aves
- Order: Strigiformes
- Family: Strigidae
- Genus: Athene
- Species: A. roseoaxillaris

Binomial name
- Athene roseoaxillaris (Hartert, EJO, 1929)
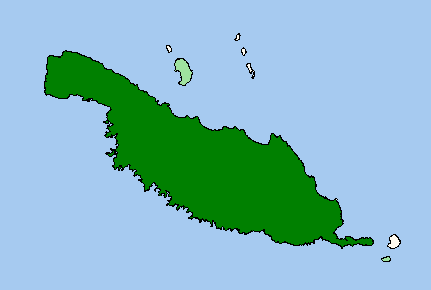
- Extant Possibly Extant

Synonyms
- Ninox roseoaxillaris

Species of owl

The Makira owl (Athene roseoaxillaris), also known as the Makira boobook, is a small to medium-sized species of owl in the Family Strigidae. It is endemic to Makira. It was formerly considered a subspecies of the Solomons boobook. The Makira boobook prefers habitats of Subtropical and Tropical Moist Lowland. It is possibly extant to Ugi Island and Owariki.

== Distribution and habitat ==
Mostly located on Makira Island, the Makira owl is indigenous to the Solomon Islands. It lives in thick tropical rainforests, preferably in places where there is a lot of canopy cover. This species is frequently found close to water sources and has been seen in both main and secondary forests. It can hunt and hide from possible enemies successfully since it prefers deep vegetation.

== Diet and feeding ==
Makira owls consume small animals such as insects and birds. The way it can locate food is with night vision and keen hearing, generally hunting from a perch right before it stealthily dives down. This owl uses little to no movement to hunt and catch prey because of its keen sense of sight and stealth.

== Physical appearance ==
The Makira owl's mottled brown plumage, bright yellow eyes, and rounded head all help it blend in well with the woodland environment, especially with its rose-colored underwing coverts. It is easily distinguished from other owl species in the area by its size and unique markings.

== Behavior/movement ==
Makira owls spend most of their lives in the deep canopy, where they rest throughout the day. Although it has a reputation for being silent, it occasionally lets out a few gentle hoots at night, especially when it's mating. The Makira owl is sedentary, with little evidence of it leaving its known range, in contrast to many other owl species. Because of habitat loss and fragmentation, it is classified as "Near Threatened" according to the most recent assessments. Although pairs may be spotted together during the mating season, the species is usually solitary.

== Feeding ==
The Makira owl is a predator that mostly eats insects, small birds, and small animals. It finds prey in the thick jungle by using its keen hearing and superb night vision. Owls usually hunt by silently perching on a branch, watching for their prey to move below, then swooping down to try to catch it. Stealth and a sense of surprise are crucial components of its hunting strategy.

== Conservation status ==
The international union for Conservation of Nature has classed the Makira owl as near threatened mostly because of habitat loss. Species is seriously threatened by Makira Island deforestation for agricultural growth and timber extraction. Owls range restricted to a single island, making it susceptible to environmental stresses such as habitat degradation. Reducing the effects of human activity and protecting Makira's remaining primary forests are the key goals for humans to conserve the Makira owl.
