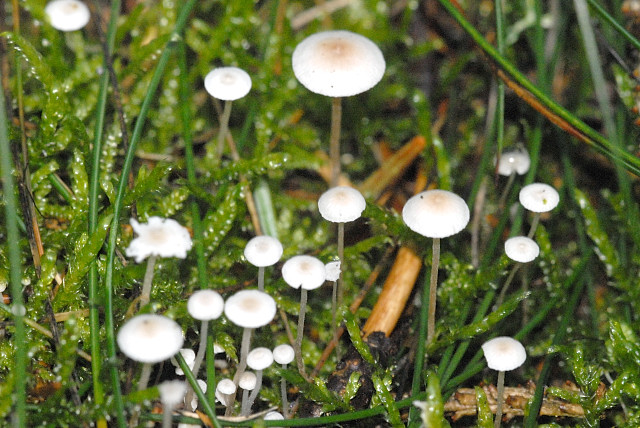
- Hemimycena lactea

Scientific classification
- Domain: Eukaryota
- Kingdom: Fungi
- Division: Basidiomycota
- Class: Agaricomycetes
- Order: Agaricales
- Family: Mycenaceae
- Genus: Hemimycena; Singer (1938)

Type species
- Hemimycena lactea (Pers.) Singer (1938)

Synonyms
- Perona Pers. (1825)

= Hemimycena =

Genus of fungi

Hemimycena is a genus of fungi in the family Mycenaceae. The genus has a widespread distribution, and according to a 2008 estimate, contains about 50 species. The genus was described by mycologist Rolf Singer in 1938. They lack amyloid reaction in the spores.

== Species ==
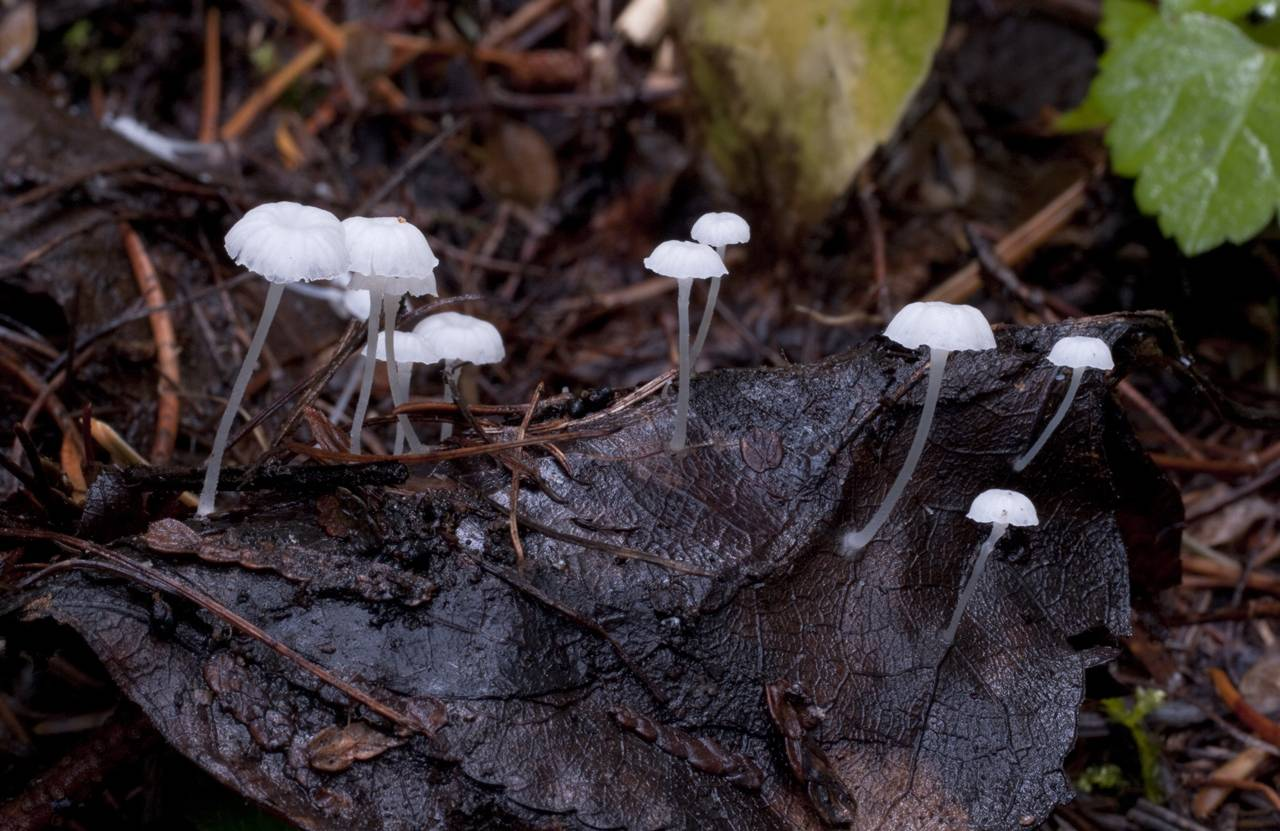
Hemimycena pseudocrispula

- H. albicolor
- H. amazonica
- H. angusta
- H. angustispora
- H. arctii
- H. aurantiaca
- H. brevispora
- H. candida
- H. cephalotricha
- H. conidiogena
- H. cretacea
- H. crispata
- H. crispuliformis
- H. crispuloides
- H. cryptomeriae
- H. cucullata
- H. cyphelloides
- H. delectabilis
- H. depauperata
- H. diplocystis
- H. epibiotica
- H. epichloë
- H. globulifera
- H. gracilis
- H. guanacastensis
- H. gypsella
- H. herrerae
- H. hirsuta
- H. ignobilis
- H. immaculata (Peck) Watling 1998
- H. indica
- H. juncicola
- H. lactea
- H. longicystis
- H. longipilosa
- H. longipleurocystidiata
- H. mairei
- H. marbleae
- H. mauretanica
- H. micropapillata
- H. minutissima
- H. naranjana
- H. nebulophila
- H. nitriolens
- H. nivea
- H. nothofagi
- H. ochrogaleata
- H. patagonica
- H. perone
- H. persimilis
- H. phlomisii
- H. pithya
- H. pithyophila
- H. pleurotiformis
- H. praedecurrens
- H. pseudoconidiophora
- H. pseudocrispata
- H. pseudocrispula
- H. pseudogibba
- H. pseudolactea
- H. reducta
- H. rickenii
- H. seegeri
- H. sordida
- H. stiriispora
- H. subglobispora
- H. subimmaculata
- H. substellata
- H. subtilis
- H. subtranslucens
- H. subtropicalis
- H. tanjae
- H. tortuosa
- H. truncicola

== See also ==
- List of Agaricales genera
