= Barn owl (disambiguation) =

Barn owl refers to species of owl in the family of owls Tytonidae, especially the genus Tyto.

Barn owl or Barn Owl may also refer to:

- Barn Owl (band), an American experimental musical duo from San Francisco, California.
- Barn Owl Review, an American literary magazine based in Akron, Ohio, USA.
- Barn Owl Trust, a charity located at Waterleat, Ashburton, Devon, England.

== See also ==
- Grass owl, some other owls in the genus Tyto
- Masked owl, some other owls in the genus Tyto
- Barnaul, the largest city and administrative centre of Altai Krai, Russia.
