= Masked owl =

Masked owl or masked-owl refers to various owls in the genus Tyto, including:

- Australian masked owl (Tyto novaehollandiae)
  - Tasmanian masked owl (Tyto novaehollandiae castanops)
- Golden masked owl (Tyto aurantia)
- Manus masked owl (Tyto manusi)
- Minahasa masked owl (Tyto inexspectata)
- Moluccan masked owl (Tyto sororcula)
- Taliabu masked owl (Tyto nigrobrunnea)
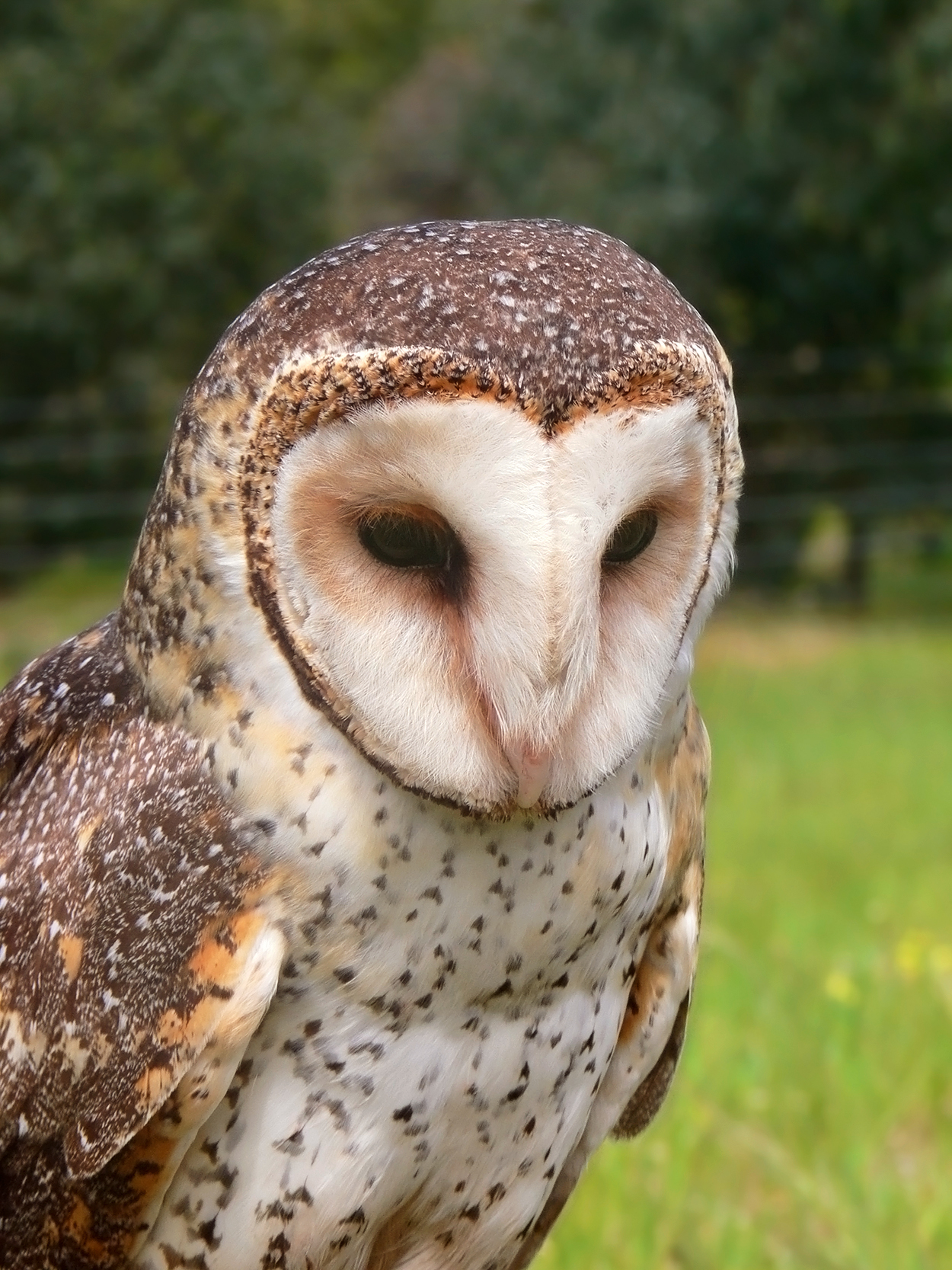

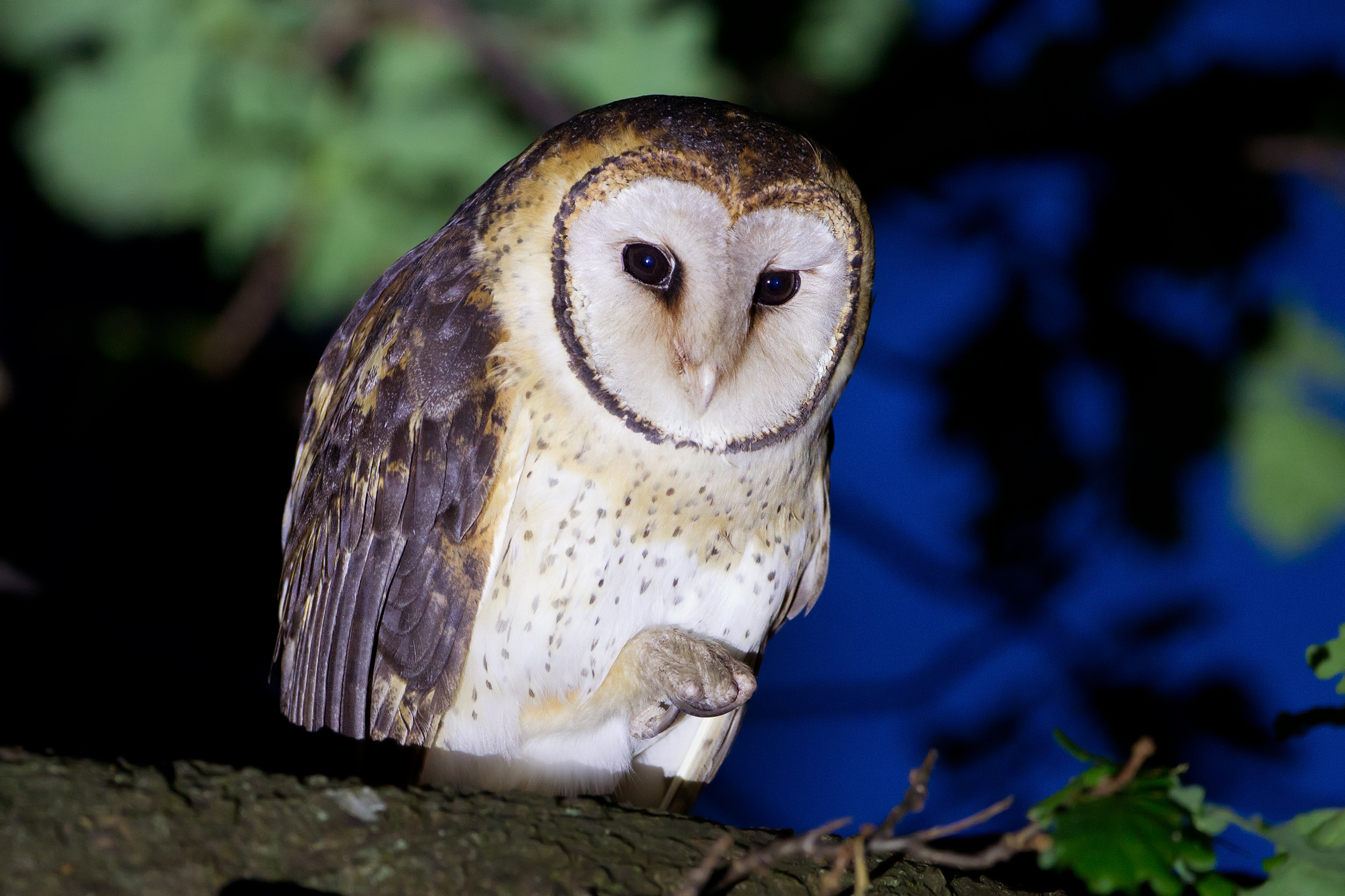

== See also ==
- Grass owl, owls in the genus Tyto
- Barn owl, owls in the genus Tyto
