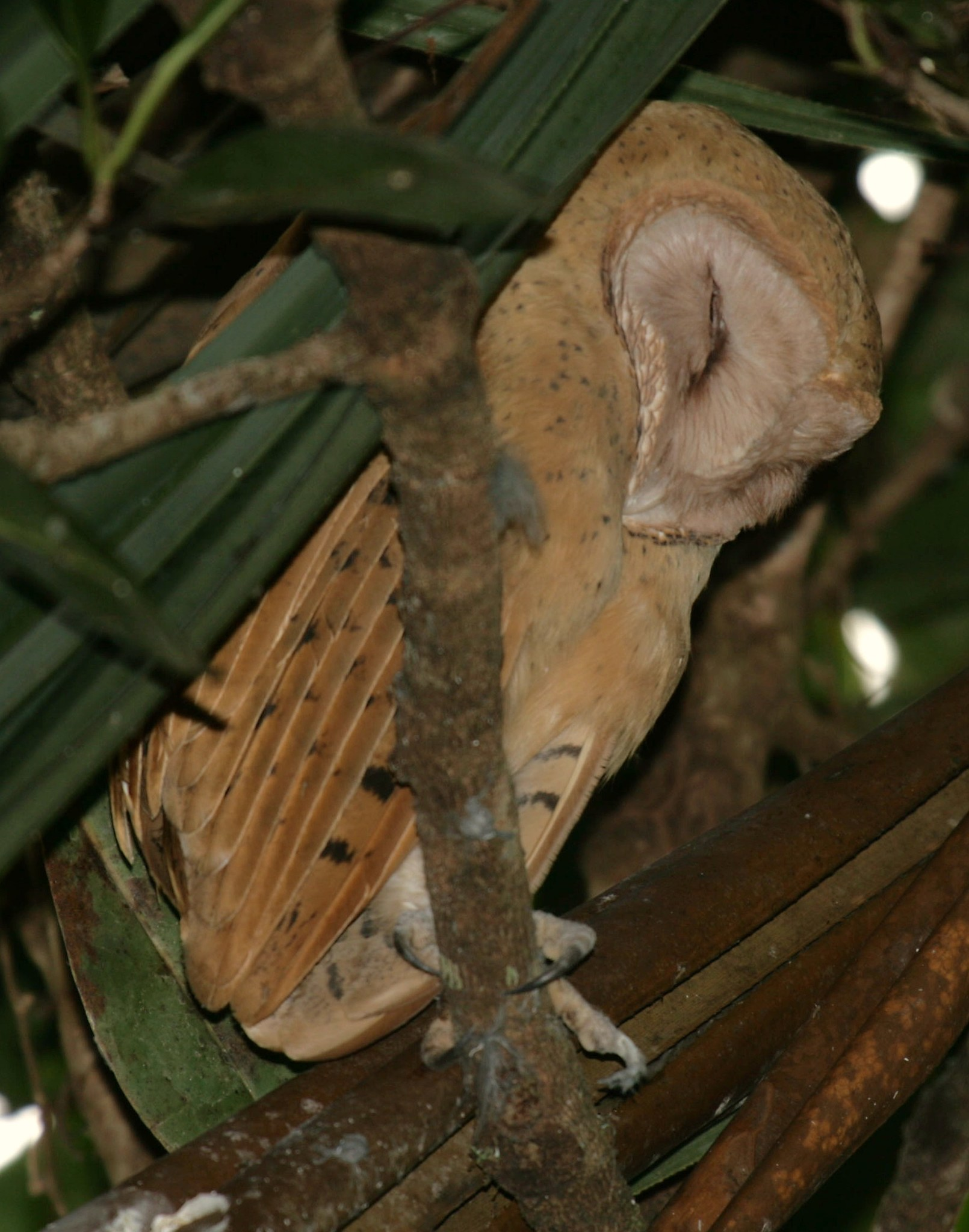
- in Sofia, Madagascar

Conservation status
- Vulnerable (IUCN 3.1)
- CITES Appendix I

Scientific classification
- Kingdom: Animalia
- Phylum: Chordata
- Class: Aves
- Order: Strigiformes
- Family: Tytonidae
- Genus: Tyto
- Species: T. soumagnei

Binomial name
- Tyto soumagnei (Grandidier, 1878)

= Red owl =

Species of owl

The red owl (Tyto soumagnei) is an owl in the barn owl family Tytonidae. It is also known as the Madagascar red owl, Madagascar grass-owl, Soumagne's owl or lesser grass-owl. It is a rare resident of Madagascar that was virtually unknown from its discovery in 1876 to its rediscovery by researchers from the World Wide Fund for Nature in 1993. It is currently listed as vulnerable because of habitat loss, but recent studies have determined it may have a wider range than first believed, though further research in distribution and ecology is required. It has possibly been overlooked because of its close resemblance to the closely related barn owl. A 2026 genetic study identified it as the closest relative of a group that includes the western, American and eastern barn owls and the ashy-faced owl; the grass owls making up the other main branch of Tyto.

The red owl resembles the cosmopolitan barn owl but is smaller (27–30 cm) and has rich orange plumage with small black spots. It is known to live in humid evergreen forest and dry deciduous forest in the east of the island, being found in primary forest and in disturbed secondary forest (possibly even human altered open areas). It feeds on native small-mammals like tenrecs (Tenrecidae) and tufted-tailed rats (as opposed to the barn owl, which feeds on introduced species). It nests and roosts in tree cavities and along cliffs with dense vegetation.

== Description ==
The red owl is an orange-red color with small black spots. Their eyes are typically a sooty-black color, the beak is a pale grey, and the cere (a fleshy patch at the base of the upper mandible of the beak) is flesh-colored. Feet are a smoke-grey color. One individual collected was measured: weight of 323 grams, body length of 275 mm, unflattened wing-length of 209 mm, tail length of 100 mm, tarsus-length of 56.6 mm and width of 6.0 mm, and a beak length from the cere of 11.6 mm.

=== Vocalization ===
The call of the red owl is similar to that of the barn owl. They make a 1.5 – 2.0 second long screeching hiss that is an even frequency with a slight downward frequency towards the end. This slight decrease in frequency at the end of the call distinguishes the red owl from the barn owl.

The red owl will produce a call when leaving the roost site, immediately after leaving the roost site, and in response to other red owls throughout the night.

== Distribution and habitat ==
The observed range of the red owl has been evolving frequently with an increase in surveys and observation since its rediscovery in 1993. The first known nest found was in August 1995 near Ambanizana, Madagascar. Initial surveys restricted populations in the north and extreme east of the island. Recent sightings have ranged from northern Madagascar, along the eastern half of the island, and more recently in the extreme southeast lowlands of Tsitongambarika. The sightings cover a fairly wide altitudinal range, from sea level to 2,000 m. Because of this expansion in observed range, it has been proposed that the red owl may be more reclusive rather than extremely rare. This has been disputed, but if the overall number of individuals is low, whether due to patchy distribution and/or low population density, it is still appropriate to consider the species vulnerable or endangered. A conservative estimate of the current population is 3,500 – 15,000 individuals with a decreasing trend. A population towards the lower side of population estimate may be true based on the relatively few number of sightings throughout history despite more extensive survey work.

With wider distribution, the difficulty detecting the species may stem from these factors:

- it is reclusive,
- it is mistaken for the barn owl in surveys,
- the species exists patchily and/or at low population densities.

The red owl inhabits dry deciduous forests to humid evergreen forests. They prefer to roost on rock ledges in ravines and cave entrances that are near degraded primary and secondary vegetation. Roost sites are typically at least 3.7 m from the ground. The species appear to prefer areas along the forest edge and slightly to heavily disturbed habitat, including rice paddies and tavies (areas where the forest has been cleared and burned to make way for cultivation). Their home ranges, roost sites, and hunting range typically encompass this type of habitat. An individual red owl has never been recorded to be in a closed canopy forest or a mature forest stand.

== Diet ==
The diet of the red owl has been determined from pellets and observation. They feed mostly on small mammals of the families Tenrecidae and Muridae that are native to the island. Prey species include insects, frogs, geckoes, tenrecs, afrosoricidians (Microgale spp., Oryzorictes hova), rodents (Eliurus spp., Rattus rattus), and the eastern rufous mouse lemur (Microcebus rufus). All species are native to Madagascar except the black rat (Rattus rattus). In one sampling of pellets, Tsingy tufted-tailed rats were 50% of the total prey mass of red owls in Ankarana. There is little to no evidence that red owls consume frogs in the wild, as they appear to prefer small mammals, but they will frequently eat frogs in captivity. Most of the prey species inhabit forests or can be found on the forest edge and in disturbed habitats.

There is almost no overlap in preferred diet between the red owl and the barn owl, despite physical similarities. Red owls eat mostly native species, while barn owls eat a greater number of introduced species.

== Threats ==
The greatest threat to the red owl has been the increasing rate of deforestation and fragmentation of its forest habitat. Madagascar's forests are among the most biologically rich and unique in the world and close to 90% of the islands species live within or on the edge of these forests and woodlands. In the 1950s, 160,000 km^{2} of forest cover (as determined from analysis of aerial photographs) was present, 26% of which was dry forest, the prime habitat for red owls. By the 2000s, analysis of aerial photos showed a decrease in forest cover to 89,800 – 101,100 km^{2} with 90% accuracy. This represents a 41% reduction in dry forest area, with most clearing at the small scale along forest edges. Dry forests were the most fragmented forest type and increased the most in fragmentation from the 1950s – 1990s. This forest degradation presents a threat to red owls as well as the prey species, such as the Tsingy tufted-tailed rats, on which the owl depends.
