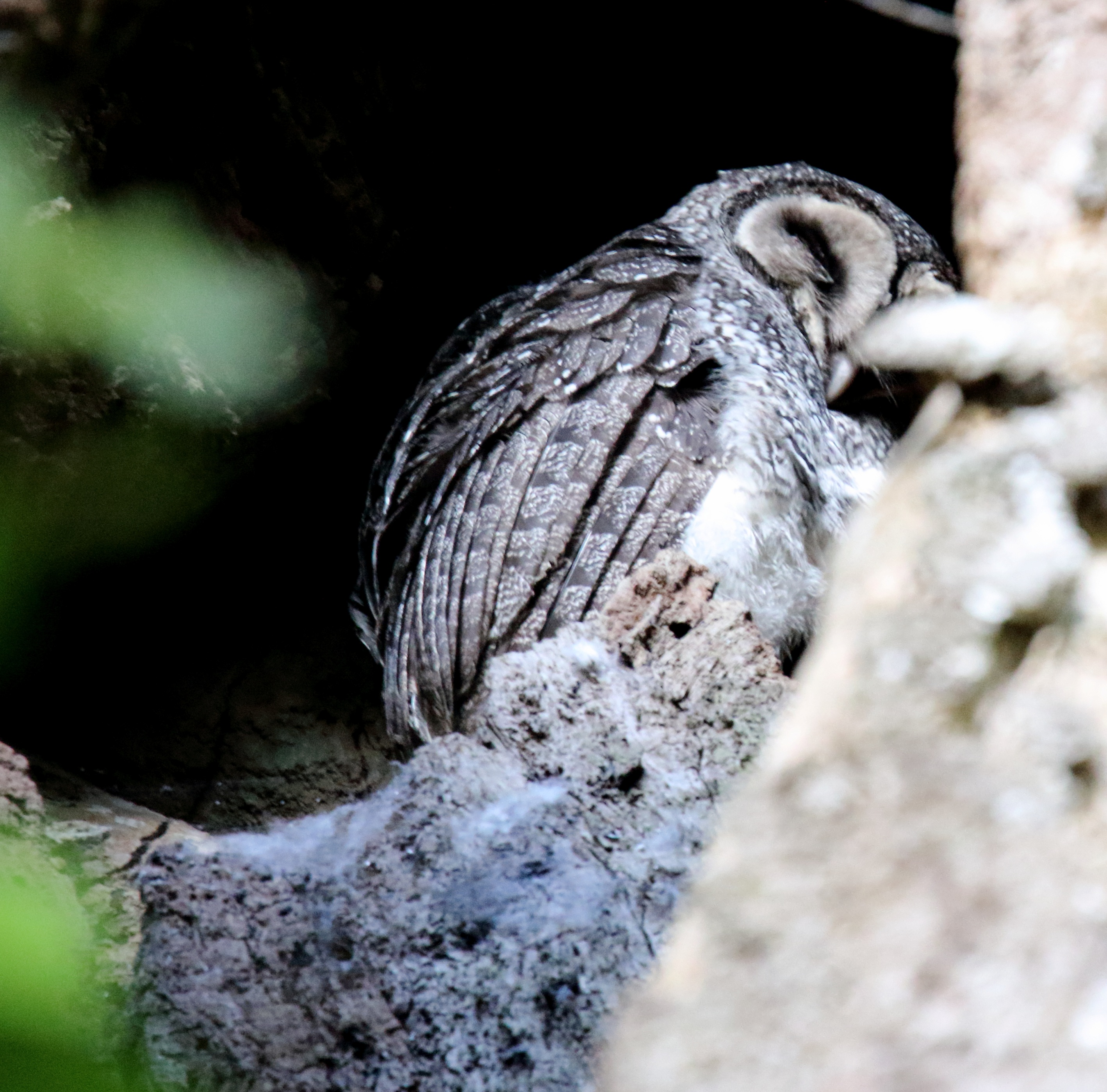
- At Malanda Falls Conservation Park, Queensland, Australia

Conservation status
- Least Concern (IUCN 3.1)
- CITES Appendix II

Scientific classification
- Kingdom: Animalia
- Phylum: Chordata
- Class: Aves
- Order: Strigiformes
- Family: Tytonidae
- Genus: Tyto
- Species: T. multipunctata

Binomial name
- Tyto multipunctata Mathews, 1912

= Lesser sooty owl =

Species of owl

The lesser sooty owl (Tyto multipunctata) is a medium-sized masked owl endemic to the wet tropics region of Australia. Once considered a subspecies of the greater sooty owl, it is distinguished by its dark plumage, heavier spotting, and higher-pitched call. The lesser sooty owl has a limited range within northeastern Australia and primarily lives in dark, sheltered areas of the rainforest.

== Description ==
The lesser sooty owl is a nocturnal owl with dark grey plumage and distinctive white speckles. Its heart-shaped facial disc is bicoloured, with a light horn-coloured bill. It averages 32–38 cm in size, with females typically being larger and more aggressive than males. They are habitat specialists which means they require a particular habitat to survive. In terms of diet, they are generalists which means they have a varied diet and are flexible with the prey they consume. In general, sooty owls are uncommon because they are difficult to observe in the dark, dense forests they live in. The sooty owl is the third largest Australian forest owl behind the powerful owl (Ninox strenua) and the rufous owl (Ninox rufa). Lesser sooty owls are known to be very territorial and release a loud whistle to ward off intruders. These owls are particularly vulnerable to changes to their habitat and resources because they are generally found in low numbers and have small clutches.

== Taxonomy ==
Owls are generally subdivided into two families, Strigidae (typical owls) and Tytonidae (barn owls). The lesser sooty owl is part of the family Tytonidae, which includes the western barn owl (Tyto alba), grass owl (Tyto longimembris) and masked owl (Tyto novaehollandiae). The lesser sooty owl is considered to be a masked owl because of the mask-like appearance of the feathers contouring its face. This facial structure allows for better reception of sound waves. Owls in the family Tytonidae, like the lesser sooty owl, have a longer and thinner skull than owls in the family Strigidae. The digital tendon locking mechanism that helps the bird perch is also thinner in the lesser sooty owl compared to most other owls.

Some researchers believe that the lesser sooty owl is a separate species from the greater sooty owl (T. tenebricosa) due to their differences in size, calls and colour of the plumage. The lesser sooty owl is smaller than the greater sooty owl and has lighter coloured plumage. However, other researchers think that these owls are part of a single species, the sooty owl. They consider the greater sooty owl (T. t. tenebricosa) and the lesser sooty owl (T. t. multipunctata) as sister subspecies.

== Habitat and distribution ==
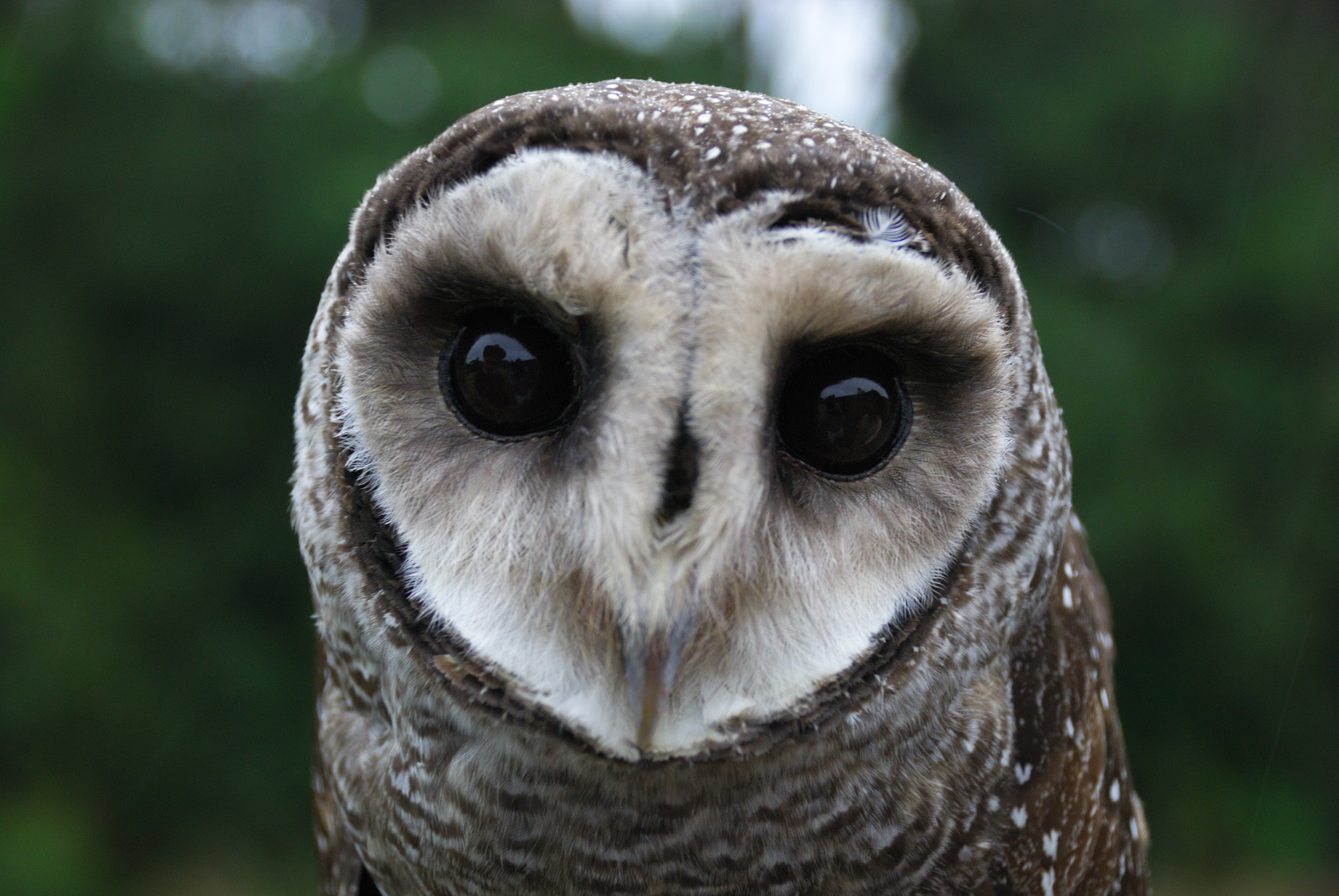
Captive bird

The lesser sooty owl is endemic to the wet tropics of the Australasian region and has a small range and a scattered distribution. This owl is restricted to wet eucalyptus forests near the coast of northeastern Queensland, Australia. These owls are often recorded north of the Great Dividing Range. The lesser sooty owl generally occupies areas of 200-800 hectares.

The lesser sooty owl inhabits primarily old-growth forests with tree hollows near 1 m deep. They mostly nest, forage and roost in less disturbed areas of the forest near the riparian zones and rainforest gullies. They tend to avoid open or exposed areas of the forest and prefer dark, cool and sheltered locations. The bird commonly roosts in foliage, vines, inside hollows of large mature trees, in caves and rocky cliff edges. Since their habitat range is confined to these dense, wetter forest types, the lesser sooty owl is considered to be a habitat specialist. In fact, they are the only member of the Tytonidae family to live deep within the forests of the Wet Tropics of Queensland.

The lesser sooty owl roosts in scented melaleuca (Melaleuca squarrosa), rough tree fern (Cyathea australis), tall saw-sedge (Gahnia aspera), mountain grey gum (Eucalyptus cypellocarpa), yertchuk (Eucalyptus consideniana), Victorian eurabbie (Eucalyptus pseudoglobulus), silvertop ash (Eucalyptus sieberi) red ironbark (Eucalyptus tricarpa) and manna gum (Eucalyptus viminalis). Males are known to use a wider variety of roosting habitats whereas females prefer to roost in tree hollows of eucalyptus trees. Sooty owls choose to roost in these locations because many of their prey are dependent on these forest types.

== Sex differences ==
Lesser sooty owls have the most pronounced reversed sexual dimorphism of any owl species in the world. Female sooty owls are 1.7 times heavier than males and 1.8 times larger than males. Females weigh 1,000-1,200 g and males weigh 550-700 g. Female sooty owls range in size from 44–51 cm and males from 37–43 cm. The two sexes also have notable differences in their diet, behaviour, calls, ranges and preferred habitat. However, both sexes have identical plumage. The average home range size of males is 3,025 hectares, and is typically larger than for females at 994 hectares.

== Behaviour ==
=== Voice ===
The owls of the Tytonidae family are known for their screaming/screeching calls. The sooty owl has multiple different calls but its main call is a high-pitched whistle and small squeaks in rapid succession.

The scream is described as a "falling-bomb whistle" and varies in volume. They can vary a scream from a soft wailing to a harsh cry. This sound differs between the male and the female. The female’s call is longer than the males and usually lasts more than 2 seconds. The male's call is less sharp than the female's, and usually lasts less than 1.5 seconds. The whistle can reach a frequency of up to 7 kHz. Another common call is the trill which is a shrill, creaking noise much like the rubbing noises some insects make. Both male and female owls emit the trilling call. It can vary but usually lasts more than 2 seconds and can attain a frequency of 8.5 kHz. When threatened, sooty owls emit a loud screech. This screech is long, raspy and harsh. It can sound a lot like a trill but more slurred and whirring. A rarer call is the latter call which has been emitted by angry adult sooty owls. Juvenile begging noises resemble a prolonged wheezy, downscale, grating. Sooty owls often call with a couple of screams followed by a couple of trills.

Sooty owl calls are loud and can reach a range of up to 1 km, depending on the landscape. The male and female are known to regularly communicate throughout the night and some pairs duet while they defend their territories. Sooty owls respond to each other’s calls from a distance and they also reply to the calls of different species like the Australian masked owl (Tyto novaehollandiae). The high-pitched calls of the sooty owl are perfect for their environment. These screams are loud enough to pierce through the dense vegetation of the rainforests they inhabit.

Sooty owls spontaneously call throughout the night but mostly at dusk and dawn, especially during the first few hours after sunset when they leave their roosts. Owls are most vocal on calm nights with no precipitation. They do not call during nights of heavy wind or rain as these conditions interfere with the propagation of sound. Calling is more frequent during the breeding period.

=== Diet ===
The lesser sooty owl is a generalist predator because it hunts a variety of prey within its limited distributional range. The owl eats mostly arboreal and terrestrial mammals. The most common arboreal prey are sugar gliders (Petaurus breviceps) and common ringtail possums (Pseudocheirus peregrinus). The main terrestrial prey are bandicoots, rats, and marsupial mice. Lesser sooty owls also feed on birds, reptiles and insects. Sooty owls eat birds such as the king parrot (Alisterus scapularis) and crimson rosella (Platycercus elegans). Most insects in their diet are beetles. Lesser sooty owls are opportunistic feeders, thus they vary their diet according to the prey available. They equally respond to changes in the community of their prey, including breeding cycles. Hence, the sooty owl’s diet can vary a lot from region to region, even within a short distance.

The lesser sooty owl consumes species near threatened or endangered under the Queensland Government legislation (Nature Conservation Act of 1992 and the Nature Conservation Wildlife Regulation of 2006) like the lemuroid ringtail possum (Hemibelideus lemuroids), Atherton antechinus (Antechinus godmani), the Herbert River ringtail possum (Pseudochirulus herbentensis), the eastern pygmy possum (Cercartetus nanus), smoky mouse (Pseudomys fumeus), broad-toothed rat (Mastacomys fuscus) and the Godman's antechinus (Antechinus godmani).

Historically, sooty owls fed mainly on terrestrial mammals, but many species are now locally extinct. As a result, the owl shifted its choice of prey to arboreal mammals. Arboreal prey increased from 55% to 81% of the owl's diet since European settlement. Over half of the owl's diet consists of introduced species such as the black rat (Rattus rattus) and the house mouse (Mus musculus). They eat species ranging from 10 to 1,300 g in weight. Females are known to consume larger prey than males. Female owls ingest prey over 1,000 g in weight whereas males eat prey less than 500 g. The main prey for females is the greater glider (Petauroides volans) whereas the main prey for males is the sugar glider.

=== Reproduction ===
In general, Tyto owls have irregular and unpredictable breeding patterns. and can breed anytime of the year, termed “aseasonal breeding”. Although, they can have peaks of breeding activity in the spring during which prey is abundant. Breeding patterns vary from region to region but the owls generally breed from March until May. Nesting is determined by environmental factors such as rain and available prey. Lesser sooty owls have been reported using flooded gum (Eucalyptus grandis), brush cherry (Syzygium paniculatum), black bean (Castanospermum australe) and ferntop ash (Ailanthus triphysa) to nest in.

These birds are monogamous and demonstrate parental care. Parents feed their young past 10 months old. Females will stay very close to the nest during breeding for 10 weeks or more. During incubation, males provide food for the female and the offspring. Once the young fledge, both parents contribute to feeding. Egg shape is described as oval or ellipsoid. Egg volume for the sooty owl ranges from 32.4 to 46.4 cm³ and the length of their eggs range from 4.45 to 5.39 cm. They usually have a clutch of 1 or 2 eggs, which is generally less than other owls and they only have one clutch a year. If a female lays more than one egg, she will lay them four days apart. Females incubate the eggs for 5–6 weeks. Young owls fledge after 2–3 months and leave their parents after 6–8 months. The young reveal dark plumage after 4 months. The newly independent owls leave as far as 10–20 km away from the nest.

== Relationship with humans ==
Researchers monitor mammal communities using lesser sooty owl pellets. Scientists study the owl pellets to keep track of vulnerable or endangered species in the area since sooty owls are known to prey on these species. Owl pellets are compact clusters of partially digested food pieces like fur, bone and feathers that the owl regurgitates from its gizzard. Owls from the family Tytonidae are known to eat their prey whole, so most of the bones in the owl pellets are intact. Hence, researchers are able to identify what species was consumed. These methods work better than surveilling mammals using trapping.

== Threats ==
The lesser sooty owl faces many threats such as habitat loss and fragmentation from logging, agriculture, urban development, tourism, mining, pine plantations, climate change and predation by domestic and feral animals. Even though the sooty owl is of least concern and its populations are currently stable, these activities cause their local extinction. These birds are particularly sensitive to disturbance since they require specific habitats and heavily depend on old-growth forests. Several of their prey rely on these forests to survive too. Logging practices and clear-cutting often remove mature, hollow trees and other elements of the forest that the owl needs for hunting and nesting activities.

In general, these owls avoid areas where intense logging activities occur. Even when small forest patches were preserved within agricultural land, the sooty owls steered clear of these areas. Therefore, fragmented habitats of 200 hectares or less are not suitable for these birds. In fact, sooty owls are considered to be the most sensitive to poor forest management in southeastern Australia. These owls only congregate in large forest reserves near streams and drainage lines.

Human disturbance and urbanisation also harm sooty owls. Noise pollution from traffic, domestic animals, such as dogs and cats, can cause the death of forest owls. Furthermore, sooty owls abandon their roosting and nesting sites when humans disturb them.

In addition, climate change threatens these owls. With a mean annual increase of the global temperature by 1 °C, 10-16% of mammals in the wet tropics of northeastern Australia will face extinction with over half of their habitat becoming lost or unsuitable. Rare species like the lemuroid ringtail possum that the owl feeds on will become extinct. A 3.5 °C rise in the wet tropics will provoke the near extinction of 60 to 80% of native mammals and half of vertebrates in this region.

== Status and conservation ==
Lesser Sooty Owl Tyto multipunctata in Cairns Zoo

According to the New South Wales Threatened Species Conservation Act of 1995, the sooty owl is vulnerable. Although, the lesser sooty owl and the other large forest owls of Australia are not listed in the Commonwealth Environment Protection and Biodiversity Conservation Act of 1999. The only states in Australia that produced a conservation plan to protect the large forest owls on all public land are Victoria and New South Wales.

In Victoria, 100 areas of 500-800 hectares have been declared conservation areas for each of the large forest owl species (powerful owl, sooty owl and masked owl). Their objective is to keep sooty owl populations viable by establishing 500 management locations on public land.

Between 1990 and 1997, New South Wales preserved mature, hollow trees in logged areas to protect sooty owls and their prey. The state strictly protected areas of the forest where owls nested, hunted and roosted. These conservation initiatives under the New South Wales Threatened Species Conservation Act of 1995 are managing forests of logging and wood production.

New South Wales and Victoria established over 100 national parks to accommodate large forest owls, including the lesser sooty owl, and its prey. Both of these states continue their efforts to preserve old-growth forests in Australia.

Furthermore, governments need to apply more management protocols on private land as efforts on these lands are minimal compared to publicly-owned land. Conservation plans need to protect multiple forested areas of at least the size of the male sooty owl range. Debate is ongoing as to how large these reserves need to be to accommodate sooty owls. States need to initiate other practices such as the control of feral predators (e.g foxes) to allow sooty owls to have better access to prey. Governments can create programs to reintroduce terrestrial species lost by feral predators. If sooty owls can access more diversity and richness of prey, they will compete less and breed more successfully.
