= Barn owl =

Common cosmopolitan owl genus

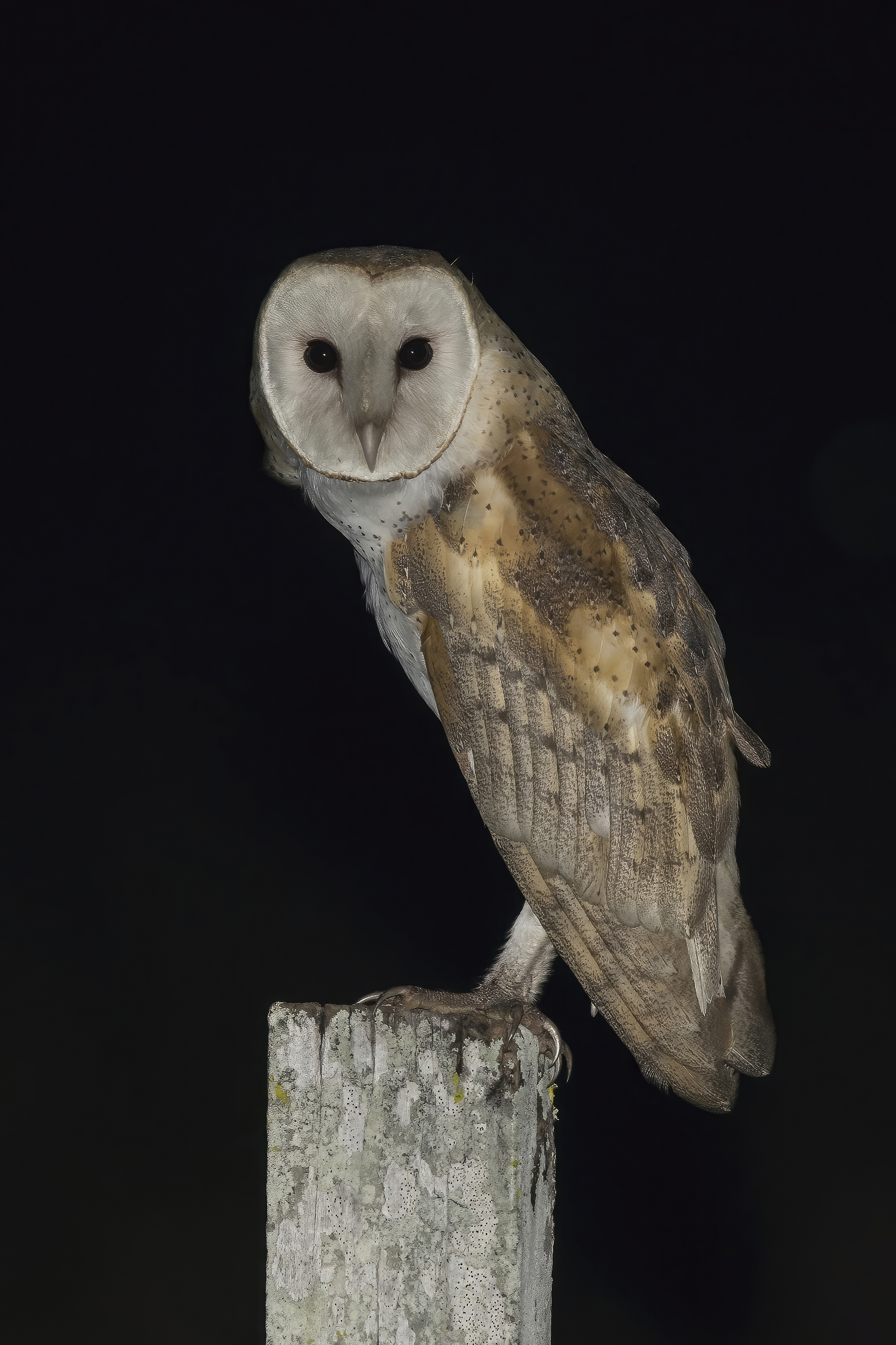
American barn owl

The barn owls are owls in the genus Tyto, the most widely distributed genus of owls in the world. They are medium-sized owls with large heads and characteristic heart-shaped faces. They have long, strong legs with powerful talons. The term may be used to describe the whole family Tytonidae, which also includes the bay owls in the genus Phodilus. Tyto is the largest genus of the Tytonidae and includes these species:

- Three species that are sometimes considered to be a single species known as barn owl or common barn owl:
  - Western barn owl T. alba in Europe, Africa, and West Asia
  - American barn owl T. furcata in the Americas
  - Eastern barn owl T. javanica in Southeast Asia and Australasia
- Andaman masked owl T. deroepstorffi endemic to the southern Andaman Islands
- New Caledonian barn owl T. letocarti on the islands of New Caledonia in Melanesia, extinct
- Rivero's barn owl T. riveroi in Cuba, extinct

== See also ==
- Grass owl, some other owls in the genus Tyto
- Masked owl, some other owls in the genus Tyto
