= Tyto richae =

Tyto richae Temporal range: Early Pliocene

Scientific classification
- Kingdom: Animalia
- Phylum: Chordata
- Class: Aves
- Order: Strigiformes
- Family: Tytonidae
- Genus: Tyto
- Species: †T. richae

Binomial name
- †Tyto richae Pavia et al., 2015

Extinct species of owl

Tyto richae is an extinct species of barn owl that lived in South Africa during the Early Pliocene, its fossils having been discovered in the Varswater Formation.
