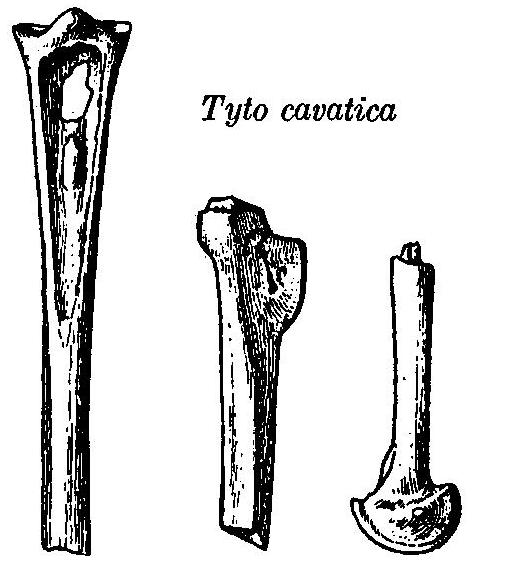
- Tibiotarsus and tarsometatarsus

Conservation status
- Extinct

Scientific classification
- Kingdom: Animalia
- Phylum: Chordata
- Class: Aves
- Order: Strigiformes
- Family: Tytonidae
- Genus: Tyto
- Species: †T. cavatica

Binomial name
- †Tyto cavatica Wetmore, 1920

= Puerto Rican barn owl =

Puerto Rican barn owl Temporal range: Late Pleistocene-Holocene

Species of bird

The Puerto Rican barn owl (Tyto cavatica) is an extinct species of barn owl that inhabited the island of Puerto Rico in the Caribbean. It is sometimes considered to be a subspecies of the ashy-faced owl (Tyto glaucops).
