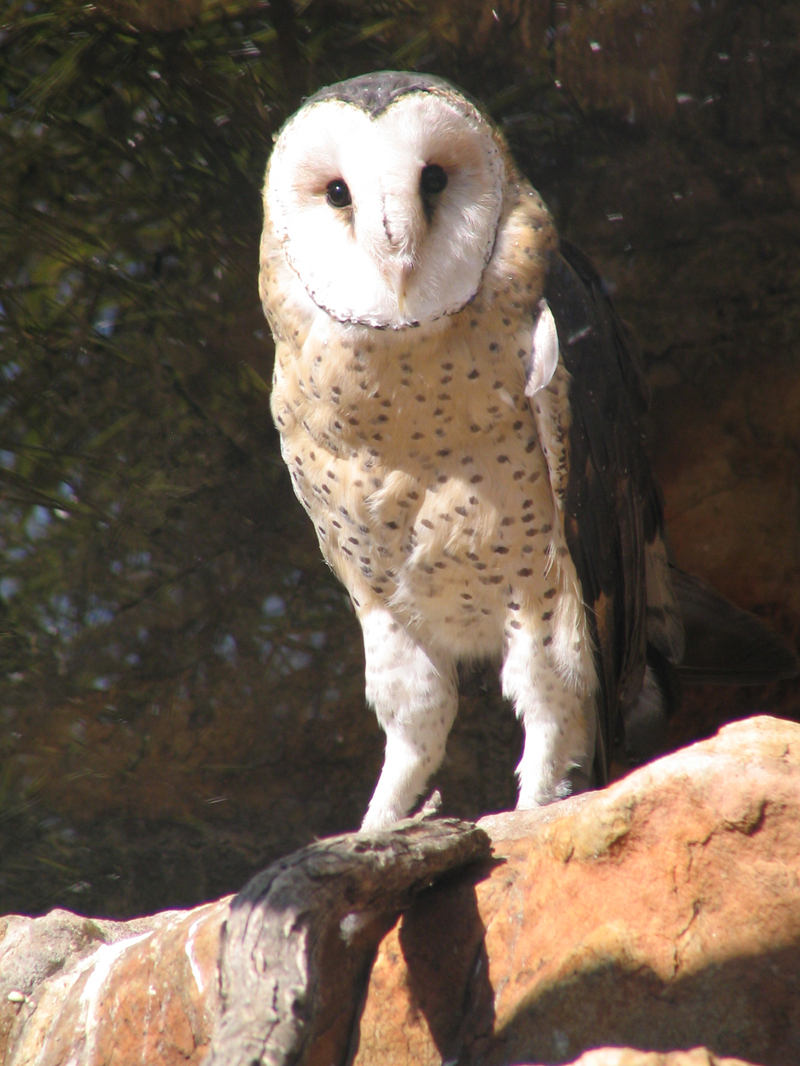

Conservation status
- Least Concern (IUCN 3.1)
- CITES Appendix II

Scientific classification
- Kingdom: Animalia
- Phylum: Chordata
- Class: Aves
- Order: Strigiformes
- Family: Tytonidae
- Genus: Tyto
- Species: T. capensis

Binomial name
- Tyto capensis (Smith, 1834)

= African grass owl =

Species of owl

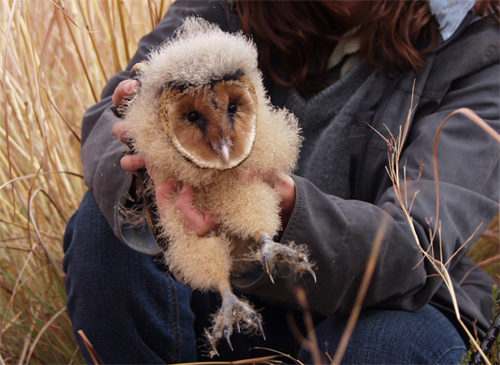
Grass owl chick rescued from a veld fire and rehabilitated onto Suikerbosrand Nature Reserve in the Gauteng province of South Africa

The African grass owl or simply grass owl (Tyto capensis) is a species of owl in the barn owl family, Tytonidae.

== Description ==
The African grass owl resembles the barn owl and has a heart shaped whitish-cream facial disc, with a narrow yellowish-buff rim which is densely spotted dark. The eyes are brownish-black, and the bill is whitish to pale pink. The entire upperparts from the crown to the lower back and wing-coverts are a uniform sooty blackish-brown, with scattered small white spots and greyish flecks. The primary feathers and secondary feathers are pale brownish-grey with dark bars and yellow bases. The short tail has uniform brown central feathers fading to paler, almost white, outer feathers which show about four dark bars. The underparts vary in colour from whitish to buff marked with dark spots. The legs have whitish feathers which extend to the lower third of the tarsi. The lower leg and feet are slightly bristled and coloured pale yellowish-grey. The body length is 38–42 cm (15–17 in), the wing length 283–345 mm (11.1–13.6 in) and they weigh between 355 and 520 g (12.5 and 18.3 oz). A high degree of sexual dimorphism is present, whereby the body mass and length is significantly larger in females than in males. This is a consequence of observable differences in hunting techniques and efficiency of brooding.

=== Voice ===
They have a screeching call which is similar to that of the barn owl, but it is less strident. A high-pitched sibilant tremolo lasting one to two seconds is thought to be the song of the male.

== Distribution ==
It is distributed in sub-Saharan Africa where there are two blocks of its main range, one in central southern Africa across southern Congo and northern Angola to the central coast of Mozambique and the other centred on South Africa from the Western Cape north to the southern extremities of Zimbabwe, Botswana and Mozambique. There are isolated populations in the Ethiopian Highlands, Kenya and Uganda and Cameroon.

== Habitat ==
The African grass owl is found in moist grassland and open savanna up to an elevation of 3,200 m (10,500 ft). In east Africa it may also be found in dry grassland and at higher altitudes in Aberdares and on Mount Kenya. In southern Africa this species generally prefers marshes and vleis where there are patches of tall, rank grass and other vegetation but it may also be found in fynbos, renosterveld and acacia scrub close to water. The specific habitat requirements of the African grass owl characterize it as a habitat specialist.

== Biology ==
The African grass owl is nocturnal and is rarely seen flying during the day. It roosts during the day on the ground in tall, rank grass where it creates domed platforms and tunnels by trampling down the surrounding grass. These tunnels can be several metres long and connect with other tunnels. The domed platform created at the end of a tunnel serves as either the nest or daytime roost site. Pairs of owls frequently roost together and occasionally small groups of owls may roost quite close to each other. It becomes active after sunset and hunts during the night, only if prey is scarce, will they fly during the early morning or late afternoon. Studies done in the Eastern Cape reveal that, in comparison with the Barn owl (Tyto alba), the African grass owl hunts later in the morning and earlier in the evening.

The preferred prey of the African grass owl are rodents and other small mammals normally weighing less than 100 g (3.5 oz) and taken from the ground. It normally hunts in an erratic flight close to the ground, listening and watching for prey, but will also "sit and wait" hunt from a perch. When the owl locates prey it dives to the ground and picks it up with its talons, feeding on the ground or taking the prey on a nearby perch. In southern Africa recorded prey items include Duthie's golden mole Chlorotalpa duthiae , African marsh rat Dasymus incomtus, Cape mole-rat Georychus capensis, vlei rats Otomys spp, multimammate mice Mastomys spp, Southern African hedgehog Atelerix frontalis, elephant shrews, hares and bats. Non mammalian prey included frogs, African snipe Gallinago nigripennis and termites. The African grass owl in Cameroon significantly hunts Soricomorpha with 70% as its main diet, while the African grass owl in different regions hunts rodentia with 90% in average.

The African grass owl breeds from December to August, but the main breeding season is from February to April. The nest is a shallow hollow lined with grass positioned at the end of a grass tunnel. The two to four white eggs are laid at two-day intervals and are incubated solely by the female while the male supplies the food. The females starts incubating as soon as the first eggs is laid and continues for 32–42 days. The female feeds the young taking food brought by the male for the first 10 days; after which, both parents feed the chicks. When the chicks are about four weeks old, the female starts to roost away from the nest. After attaining five weeks of age the owlets begin to wander around the nest, before attempting their first flights at around seven weeks. Once fledged, the young stay with the parents for about 3 weeks, and are independent after that. Prey which are fed to the young are often first decapitated.

African grass owls have been recorded as being preyed on by the African marsh harrier Circus ranivorus.

== Taxonomy and subspecies ==
The African grass owl species is regarded by some authors as the same species as the eastern grass owl Tyto longimembris of Asia and Australia. There are two subspecies of African grass owl currently recognised:

- Tyto capensis cameroonensis: Cameroon Highlands.
- Tyto capensis capensis:the rest of the range.

== Conservation status ==
The African grass owl is evaluated as Least Concern. However, in South Africa the species is regarded as vulnerable because habitat degradation through ploughing, grazing, draining and burning; the population in the country is considered to be fewer than 5,000 individuals.

The habitats in which this species breeds and feeds are often alongside areas of human activity, such as industrial, agricultural or mining areas. This causes exposure to various environmental contaminants, for example, metals, which can subsequently be monitored using the birds' feathers. The African grass owl is a good bioindicator species.

To combat their state of vulnerability in South Africa, programmes of captive breeding and release for the African grass owl were tested and studies revealed that this may be a possible effective conservation strategy. However, reintroduction of the African grass owl is not a simple process because supplementary feeding is required and the habitat must be suitable and contain sufficient prey.
