= Tyto balearica =

Tyto balearica Temporal range: Miocene-Pleistocene

Scientific classification
- Kingdom: Animalia
- Phylum: Chordata
- Class: Aves
- Order: Strigiformes
- Family: Tytonidae
- Genus: Tyto
- Species: †T. balearica

Binomial name
- †Tyto balearica Mourer-Chauviré et al., 1980

Species of bird (fossil)

Tyto balearica is an extinct species of Tyto that lived during the Neogene and Quaternary.

== Distribution ==
Fossils of T. balearica are known from the Balearic Islands in Spain.
