= Tyto mourerchauvireae =

Tyto mourerchauvireae Temporal range: Middle Pleistocene

Scientific classification
- Kingdom: Animalia
- Phylum: Chordata
- Class: Aves
- Order: Strigiformes
- Family: Tytonidae
- Genus: Tyto
- Species: †T. mourerchauvireae

Binomial name
- †Tyto mourerchauvireae Pavia, 2004

Extinct species of bird

Tyto mourerchauvireae is an extinct species of owl in the genus Tyto that lived during the Middle Pleistocene.

== Distribution ==
Tyto mourerchauvireae is known from Sicily.
