= Grass owl =

Grass owl may refer to:

- African grass owl (Tyto capensis), a species of bird found in Africa
- Eastern grass owl (Tyto longimembris), a species of bird found in Asia, Australasia, and the western Pacific

== See also ==
- Barn owl, owls in the genus Tyto
- Masked owl, owls in the genus Tyto
