= New Caledonian barn owl =

New Caledonian barn owl Temporal range: Late Pleistocene-Holocene

Scientific classification
- Kingdom: Animalia
- Phylum: Chordata
- Class: Aves
- Order: Strigiformes
- Family: Tytonidae
- Genus: Tyto
- Species: T. letocarti

Binomial name
- Tyto letocarti Balouet & Olson, 1989

Extinct species of bird

The New Caledonian barn owl (Tyto letocarti), also referred to as Letocart's barn owl, is an extinct species of owl in the barn owl family. It was endemic to the island of New Caledonia in Melanesia in the southwestern Pacific region. It was described from Late Pleistocene to Holocene aged subfossil bones found at the Gilles Cave paleontological site on the west coast of Grande Terre. The holotype is a complete adult left femur (NCG 1000), held by the Muséum national d'histoire naturelle in Paris. The owl was described as Tyto? letocarti, indicating uncertainty as to generic placement at the time. The specific epithet honours Yves Letocart of New Caledonia's Water and Forest Service, who was active in bird conservation and paleontological work on the island.

== Ecology and extinction ==
Owl pellets found in cave deposits predating human arrival to the island indicate that the New Caledonian barn owl relied almost entirely on hunting reptiles, which is consistent with New Caledonia lacking any terrestrial mammalian species at the time. Following the arrival of humans, the number of reptiles declined abruptly, whether by direct anthropic action or predation and competition with introduced commensal rodents like the Polynesian rat. The resulting lack of prey caused the New Caledonian barn owl's extinction. Afterward, New Caledonia was colonized by the eastern barn owl (Tyto javanica), whose diet is rodent-based instead.
