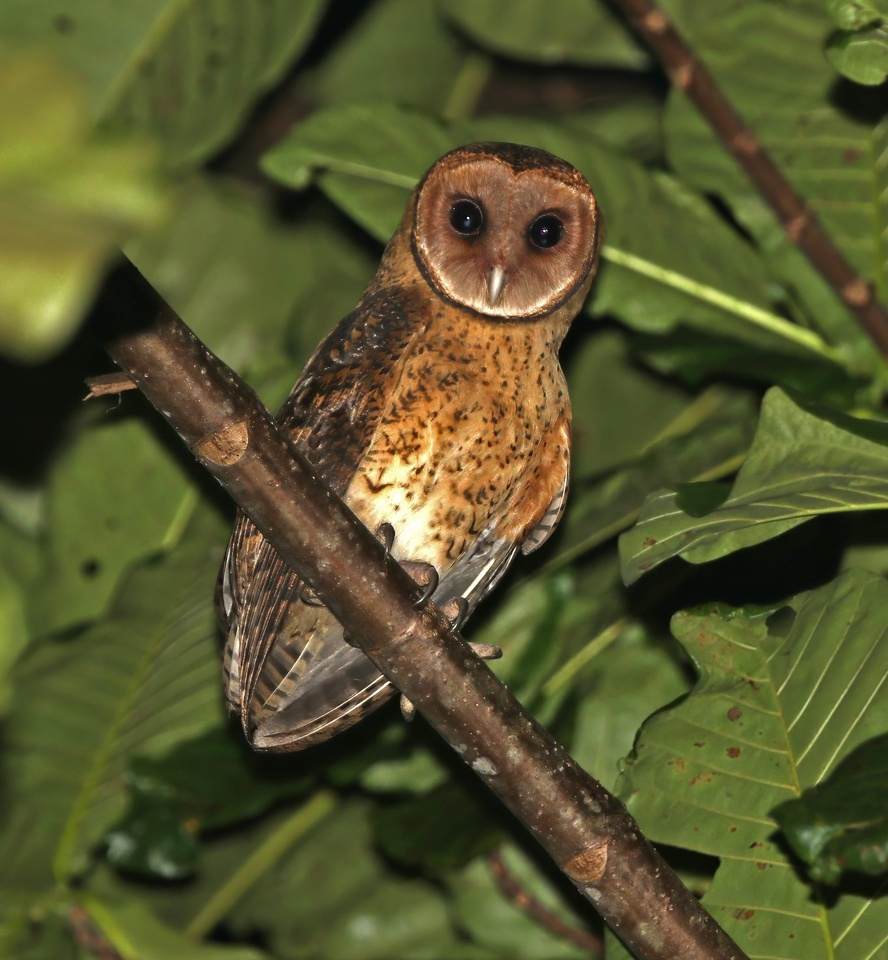

Conservation status
- CITES Appendix II

Scientific classification
- Kingdom: Animalia
- Phylum: Chordata
- Class: Aves
- Order: Strigiformes
- Family: Tytonidae
- Genus: Tyto
- Species: T. sororcula

Binomial name
- Tyto sororcula (Sclater, PL, 1883)

= Moluccan masked owl =

Species of owl

The Moluccan masked owl (Tyto sororcula), also known as the lesser masked owl, is a species of owl in the barn owl family. It is endemic to the south Moluccas of Indonesia. Some taxonomists consider this species to be conspecific with the Australian masked owl.

== Taxonomy ==
Described subspecies of Tyto sororcula include:

- T. s. sororcula (Sclater, PL, 1883)
- T. s. cayelli (Hartert, EJO, 1900)
