= Minahasa masked owl =

Conservation status
- Least Concern (IUCN 3.1)
- CITES Appendix II

Scientific classification
- Kingdom: Animalia
- Phylum: Chordata
- Class: Aves
- Order: Strigiformes
- Family: Tytonidae
- Genus: Tyto
- Species: T. inexspectata

Binomial name
- Tyto inexspectata (Schlegel, 1879)

Species of owl

The Minahasa masked owl (Tyto inexspectata), also known as the Minahasa barn owl, Sulawesi owl or Sulawesi golden owl, is a barn owl endemic to the island of Sulawesi, Indonesia. The name is derived from the Minahassa Peninsula, where it was first described as a breeding bird; however, it is also known to live in north-central Sulawesi.

The Minahasa masked owl has short wings with a wingspan of 240–250 mm (9.4–9.8 in), well suited to its habitat in deep forests. It appears to prefer undisturbed or lightly disturbed rainforest at altitudes of 100–1,600 m (330–5,250 ft). As the primary lowland forests on the Minahasa peninsula has been destroyed, the survival of the species depends on the more inaccessible montane forests. The species is known to inhabit the two large protected regions (Bogani Nani Wartabone and Lore Lindu National Parks) established in central Sulawesi and Minahassa Peninsula. The remaining population is estimated to be 2,500–10,000.
