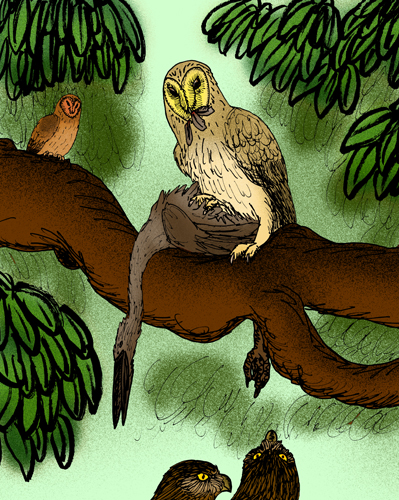
- Restoration

Scientific classification
- Kingdom: Animalia
- Phylum: Chordata
- Class: Aves
- Order: Strigiformes
- Family: Tytonidae
- Genus: Tyto
- Species: T. riveroi

Binomial name
- Tyto riveroi Arredondo, 1972

= Rivero's barn owl =

Rivero's barn owl Temporal range: Pleistocene

Extinct species of bird

Rivero's barn owl (Tyto riveroi) is an extinct species of barn owl that was very large — bigger than any extant barn owl species, and possibly larger than any known owl alive today. It is thought to have been nearly as large as (but probably not as tall as) another extinct gigantic owl, Ornimegalonyx. Suárez and Olson demoted T. riveroi as a junior synonym of Tyto pollens in 2015.
