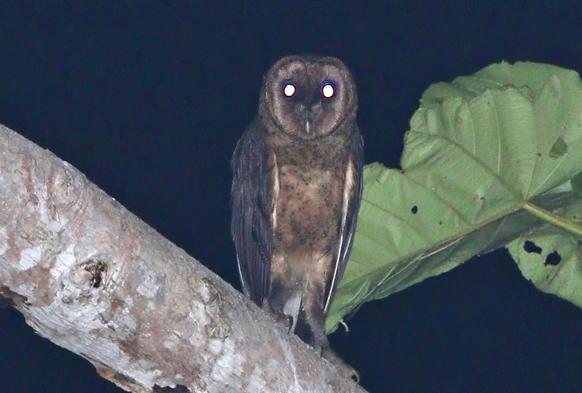

Conservation status
- Near Threatened (IUCN 3.1)
- CITES Appendix II

Scientific classification
- Kingdom: Animalia
- Phylum: Chordata
- Class: Aves
- Order: Strigiformes
- Family: Tytonidae
- Genus: Tyto
- Species: T. j. nigrobrunnea

Binomial name
- Tyto javanica nigrobrunnea Neumann, 1939

= Taliabu masked owl =

Species of owl

The Taliabu masked owl (Tyto javanica nigrobrunnea), also known as the Taliabu owl or the Sula Islands barn owl, is a subspecies of the eastern barn owl, of the barn owl family, Tytonidae. This is one of the two groups of owls, the other being the typical owls, family Strigidae. It is endemic to Taliabu Island of Indonesia.

This species was first identified in 1938 when the type specimen, an adult female, was collected. The species was not seen again until 1991, but has since been observed on at least 16 separate occasions.
