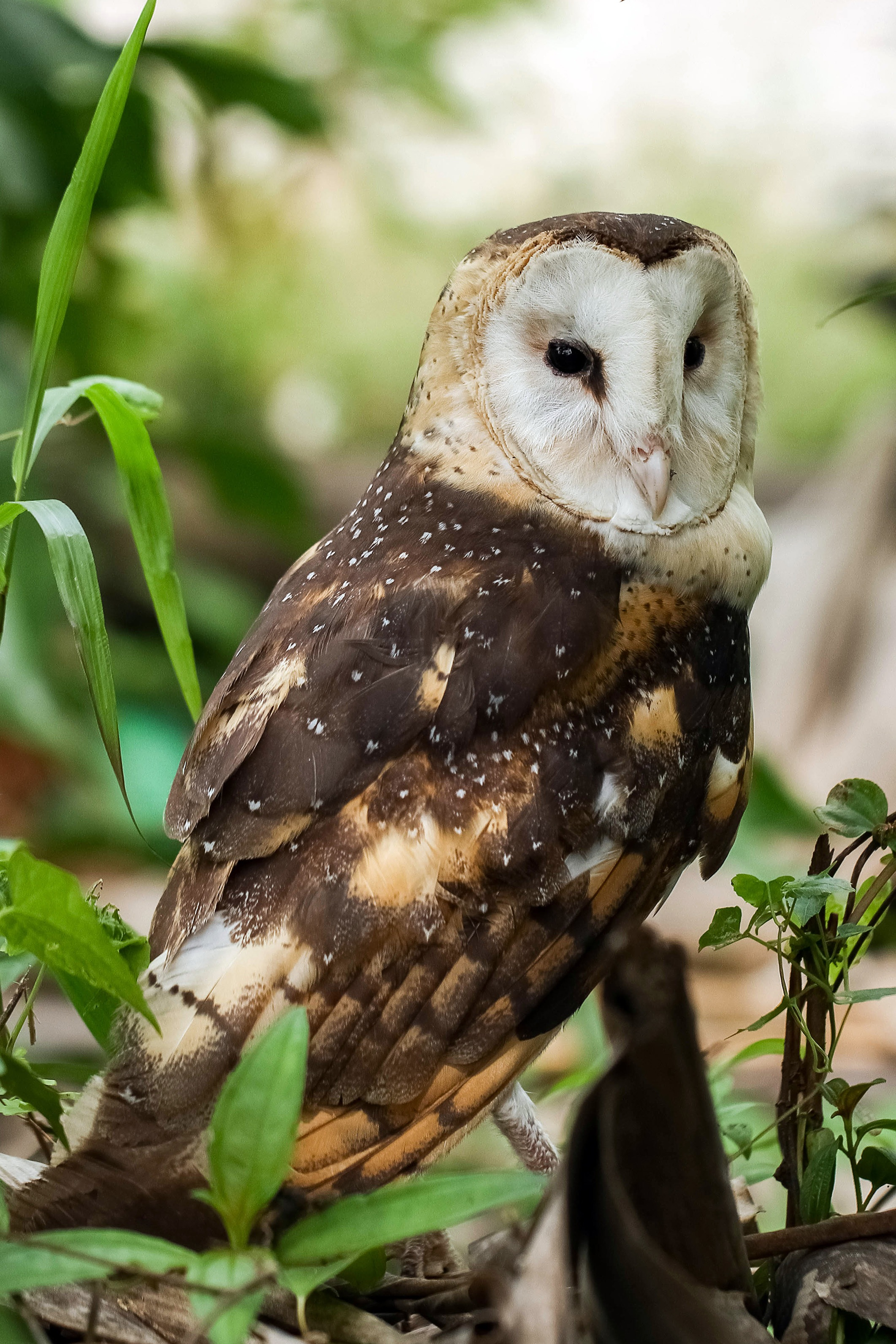

Conservation status
- Least Concern (IUCN 3.1)
- CITES Appendix II

Scientific classification
- Kingdom: Animalia
- Phylum: Chordata
- Class: Aves
- Order: Strigiformes
- Family: Tytonidae
- Genus: Tyto
- Species: T. longimembris

Binomial name
- Tyto longimembris (Jerdon, 1839)

Synonyms
- Strix candida Tickell, 1833; Strix candidus Tickell, 1833; Strix longimembris Jerdon, 1839; Aluco longimembris McGregor, 1908

= Eastern grass owl =

Species of owl

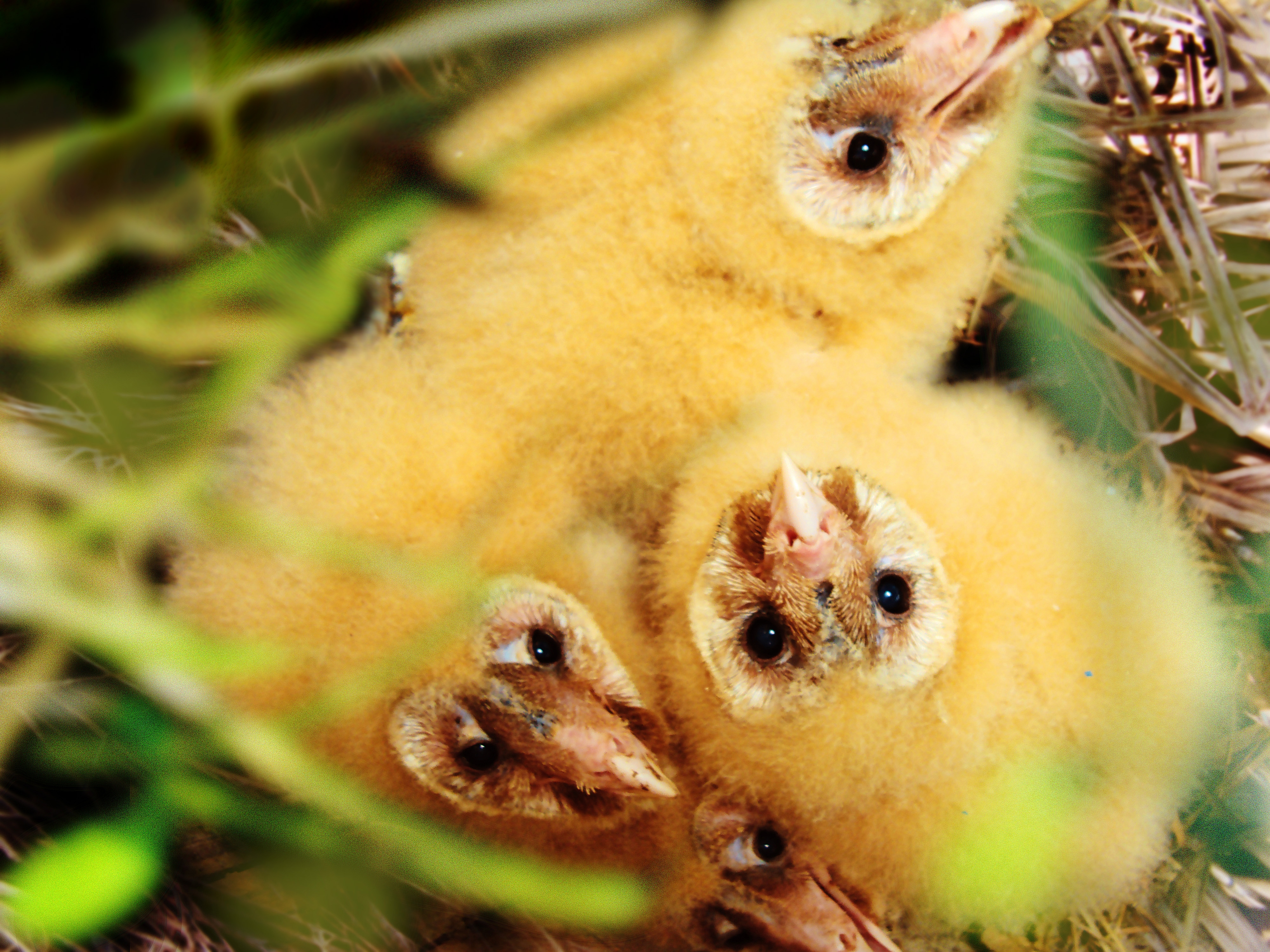
Eastern grass owl (immature)

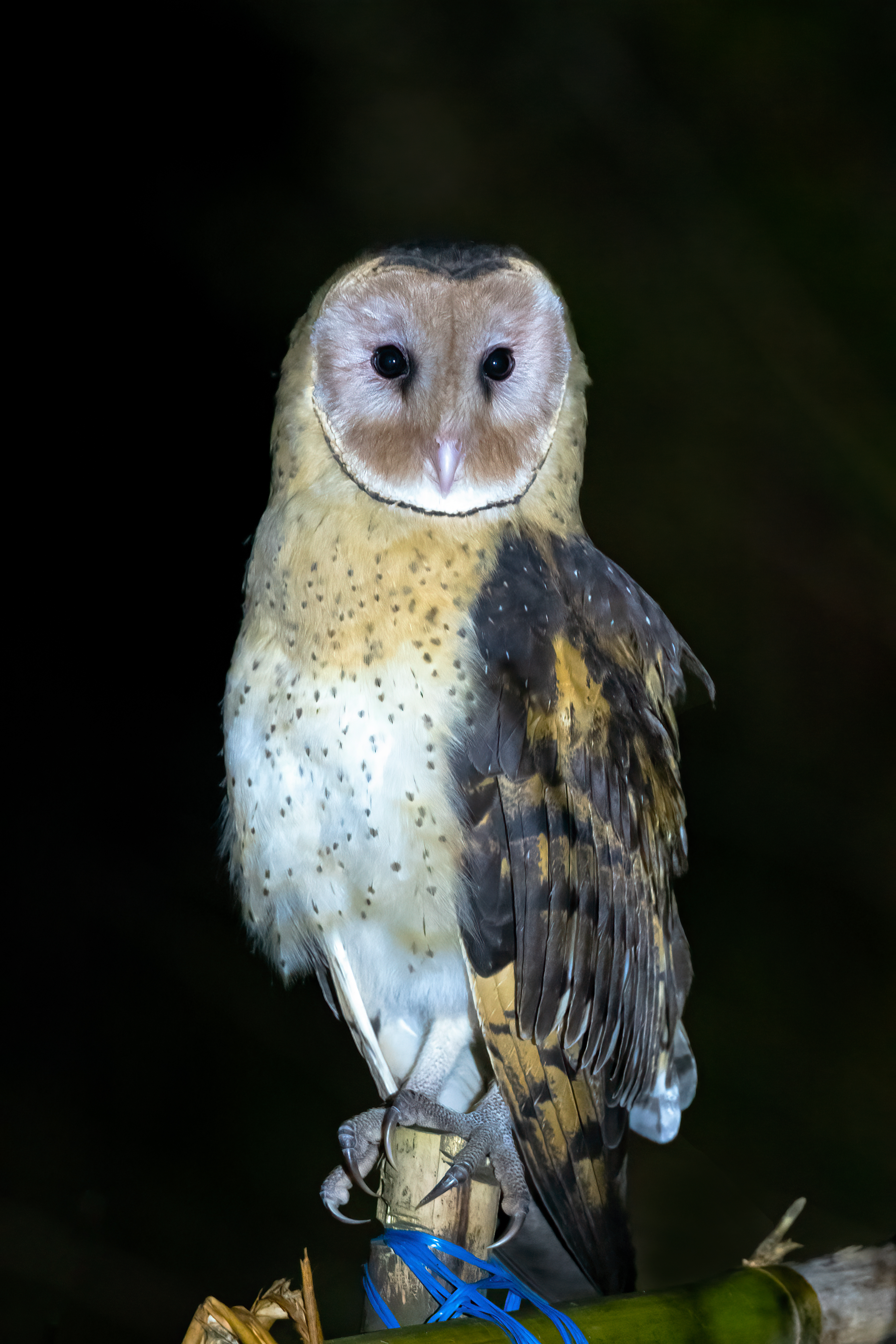
Eastern grass owl in Laina grassland, Tinsukia, Assam, India

The eastern grass owl (Tyto longimembris), also known as Chinese grass owl or Australasian grass owl, is a species of owl in the family Tytonidae. They feed predominantly on small rodents.

Though some authorities consider this owl to be conspecific with the African grass owl, T. capensis, other consider it to be a valid species.

== Description ==
The eastern grass owl is a medium-sized owl, similar in size to the barn owl. Adult males measure from 32 to 38 cm (13 to 15 in) in length, while the larger females can measure from 35 to 42 cm (14 to 17 in). The wingspan is from 100 to 116 cm (39 to 46 in). The female weighs 460 g (16 oz) while the male weighs 400 g (14 oz). They have dark brown or tan upper parts with pale spots. They have black and tan bars on its wings and a very pale beak, feathered legs, and dark brown eyes. Like all Tyto owls, it has a heart-shaped facial disk with brown buff and a white bordering.

== Subspecies ==
- T. l. Pithecops (Swinhoe, 1866) – Taiwan. It is mainly found in the southern lowlands and foothills. Locally, it is known in Taiwanese as the “monkey-faced owl” due to its monkey-like facial appearance.

== Call ==
The eastern grass owl's primary call is similar to that of other Tyto species, emitting a harsh, hissing screech or "scream"; however, it is somewhat louder than that of the common barn owl (T. alba), but softer than the call of a masked owl (T. novaehollandiae).

== Hunting ==
Studies in parts of Australia have shown that the most common prey is the long-haired rat and the cane rat. Prey are detected from on the wing. The owl uses its long legs to penetrate dense ground cover and seize its prey.

== Habitat ==
This owl prefers tall grasslands and swamps. Roost areas consist of flattened vegetation within systems of "tunnels" through the swamp vegetation. Nesting is in similar situations.

== Distribution ==
Eastern grass owls live in eastern, southern and southeast Asia, parts of New Guinea, the Philippines, Australia (mainly in Queensland) and the western Pacific.

== Conservation status ==
Eastern grass owls are considered "Least Concern" globally, primarily because of their wide distribution. Within Australia, T. longimembris is considered vulnerable on the New South Wales Threatened Species Conservation Act (1995).

=== In Taiwan ===
The eastern grass owl (Tyto longimembris) is classified globally as “Least Concern,” yet its Taiwan-endemic subspecies, Tyto longimembris pithecops, is rare with a small population. It is legally protected in Taiwan as a Category I species under the Wildlife Conservation Act (1989), a status equivalent to “Endangered.”

Since the 1980s, government-led rodent control programs in Taiwan have resulted in the widespread use of rodenticides in farmland. These chemicals have been linked to mortality in various raptor species that prey on rodents, reptiles, and birds. The detection of anticoagulant rodenticides in deceased raptors, such as the black-winged kite, has raised concerns that the eastern grass owl may also be at risk, as it occupies similar habitats and relies on comparable prey. In addition to the threat of secondary poisoning, afforestation on abandoned farmland has further altered or reduced the subspecies’ suitable open habitats.

In response to these findings, the Taiwanese government gradually reduced the distribution of rodenticides, terminating proactive distribution in 2015. However, farmers can still apply for rodenticides through local agricultural authorities when necessary. In 2021, the Forestry and Nature Conservation Agency of the Ministry of Agriculture (MOA) formally implemented the Ecosystem Service Payment Program for Endangered Species and Habitats. Under this program, the eastern grass owl was designated as a priority species, and farmers receive financial incentives for adopting wildlife-friendly practices, such as refraining from herbicides, rodenticides, traps, and toxic baits, and complying with pesticide residue safety standards. Research initiatives and incentive-based conservation programs have been implemented to support the protection of the eastern grass owl in Taiwan.
