= Manus masked owl =

Conservation status
- CITES Appendix II

Scientific classification
- Kingdom: Animalia
- Phylum: Chordata
- Class: Aves
- Order: Strigiformes
- Family: Tytonidae
- Genus: Tyto
- Species: T. manusi

Binomial name
- Tyto manusi Rothschild & Hartert, 1914

Species of owl

The Manus masked owl (Tyto manusi) is a barn owl endemic to Manus Island in the Admiralty Islands. Some authors consider it a subspecies of Australian masked owl (Tyto novaehollandiae).

It is a poorly known forest-dwelling species, which is rarely seen. Comparison with the closely related Australian masked owl indicates it is likely to have large territories, and the population may be smaller than 1000.
