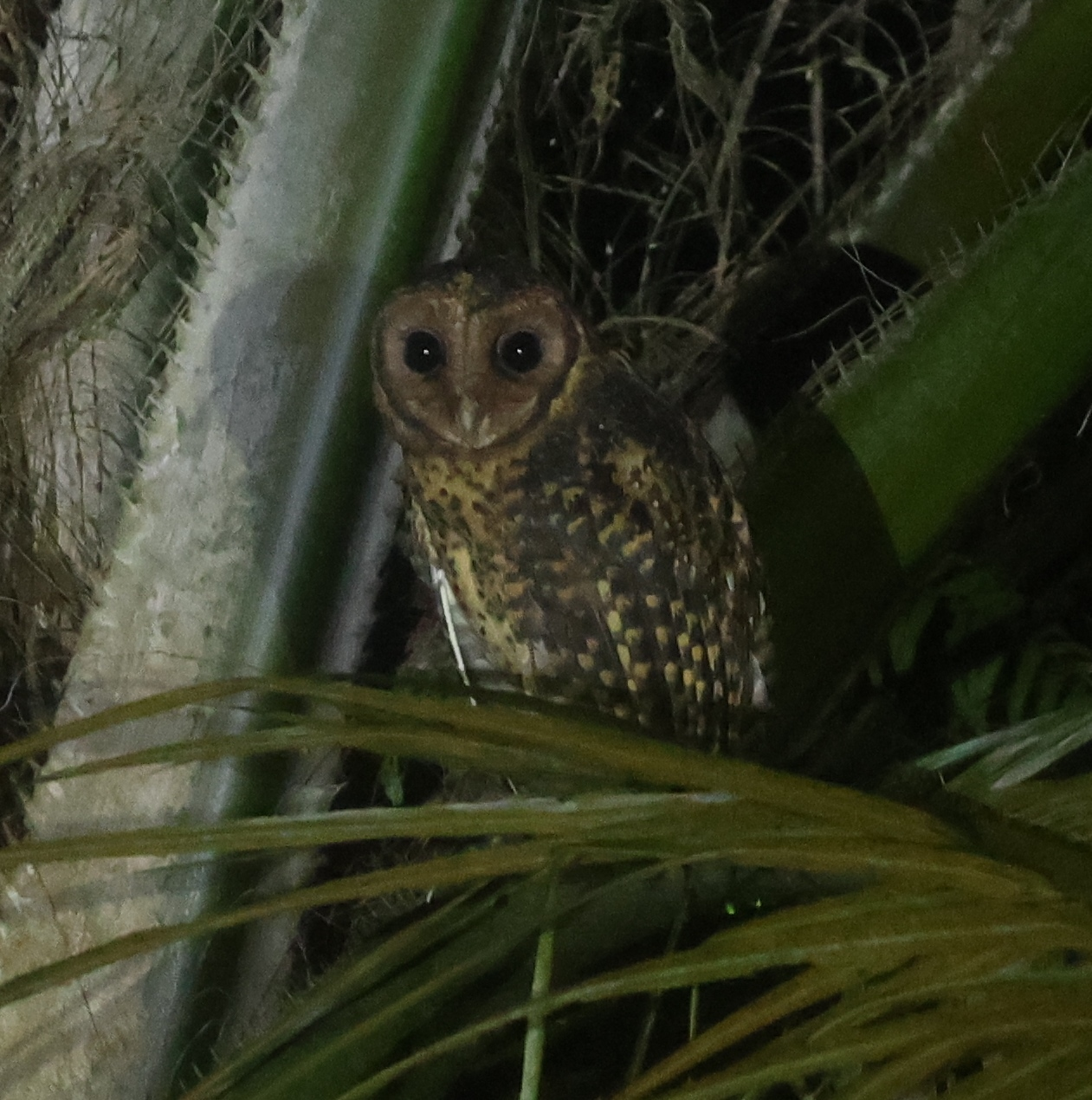

Conservation status
- Vulnerable (IUCN 3.1)
- CITES Appendix II

Scientific classification
- Kingdom: Animalia
- Phylum: Chordata
- Class: Aves
- Order: Strigiformes
- Family: Tytonidae
- Genus: Tyto
- Species: T. aurantia

Binomial name
- Tyto aurantia (Salvadori, 1881)

= Golden masked owl =

Species of owl

The golden masked owl (Tyto aurantia) is a barn owl endemic to the island of New Britain, Papua New Guinea. It is also known as New Britain barn owl, New Britain masked owl, Bismarck owl and Bismarck masked owl.

As with other tropical barn owls, it is difficult to spot in the wild and therefore poorly studied. It is likely to be a lowland forest or coniferous species.

Given the paucity of reliable information, it was for some time classified as a data deficient species by the IUCN. When its status could finally be evaluated properly, earlier assessments were found to be correct, and it is once again listed as a Vulnerable species in the 2008 red list.

== General description ==
Golden masked owls are characterized by their brown, light-brown, and white feathered plumages along with their arguably most distinctive feature - their heart-shaped, bright white face. There is considerable variation in the exact weight of the species, but most birds range from 0.9 to 1.7 pounds, with heights ranging from 10.6 to 12.9 inches. The golden masked owl is a largely solitary and nocturnal species. Being mostly active at night, golden masked owls have developed a keen sense of hearing which is also common in nocturnal owl species. Golden masked owls are carnivorous and most of their prey is hunted on the ground with the majority of their prey consisting of small mammals such as rodents, other birds, rabbits, and insects.

== Dwelling and nesting behaviour ==
Golden masked owl dwellings are commonly hollow trees. The size and style of dwelling best suits the golden masked owl's nesting behavior which involves laying an average of 2 to 3 eggs. With its most common predators being eagles, hawks, and larger owls, golden masked owl dwellings also serve as protection from these predators for both the eggs and the female owl while it incubates them over the course of roughly 32 days. The golden masked owl dwelling also serves to protect newly born owlets in the period of time between when they hatch and when they are able to live independently which is roughly 80 days.

== Habitat loss ==
The golden masked owl's primary habitat, as previously stated is lowland or coniferous forests on the island of New Britain which is located off the coast of Papua New Guinea. Their unique habitat plays a key role in the survival of their species, and habitat loss has caused their conservation status to fall to vulnerable over time. While not explicitly endangered, being labeled as a vulnerable species is still within the broader category of being threatened. Their current habitat range is roughly 63,000 square kilometers; however, the status of forests and the larger ecoregion on New Britain and neighboring New Ireland have since been labeled as "critical/endangered" by the World Wide Fund for Nature (WWF). This projection means that the golden masked owl is currently in danger of further habitat loss. As a result, the population of golden masked owls, currently in the range of 2500 to 9999 individuals, is trending downward. Habitat loss in the case of the golden masked owls can be directly attributed to deforestation on New Britain island which is a product of large-scale infrastructure projects, agricultural expansion, and commercial logging.
