= Ashy-faced owl =

- Ashy-faced owl, Santa Cruz de Barahona, Dominican Republic

Conservation status
- Least Concern (IUCN 3.1)
- CITES Appendix II

Scientific classification
- Kingdom: Animalia
- Phylum: Chordata
- Class: Aves
- Order: Strigiformes
- Family: Tytonidae
- Genus: Tyto
- Species: T. glaucops

Binomial name
- Tyto glaucops (Kaup, 1852)

Species of bird

The ashy-faced owl (Tyto glaucops) is a species of bird in the barn-owl family Tytonidae. It is found on the Caribbean island of Hispaniola, on Dominica, and on several other islands of the Lesser Antilles.

== Taxonomy and systematics ==
The ashy-faced owl was formally described in 1852 by the German naturalist Johann Jakob Kaup and given the binomial name Strix glaucops. The specific epithet is from Ancient Greek glaukos meaning "blue-grey" or "glaucous". Kaup specified the type locality as Jamaica. This was an error and has been corrected to Hispaniola. The ashy-faced owl is now placed in the genus Tyto that was introduced in 1828 by Gustaf Johan Billberg.

The taxonomy of the ashy-faced owl is unsettled. At one time it was considered conspecific with the barn owl sensu lato (Tyto alba). After the separation the International Ornithological Committee (IOC) long treated it as monotypic and endemic to Hispaniola, but in July 2023 moved two subspecies from the American barn owl (Tyto furcata) into it. The North American Classification Committee of the American Ornithological Society (AOS/NACC) and the Clements taxonomy retain it as monotypic. In 2022 the AOS/NACC rejected a proposal to make that move. In 2026, genetic research identified that two museum specimens of nigrescens from Dominica, and one of insularis from Saint Vincent that were sampled for mitochondrial DNA, grouped with American barn owls rather than with ashy-faced owls from Hispaniola. The Hispaniolan birds were a separate lineage, closely related to the American barn owl. BirdLife International's Handbook of the Birds of the World (HBW) has long treated the ashy-faced owl as having the three subspecies recognized by the IOC, and adds a fourth, T. glaucops cavatica for the extinct Puerto Rican race.

=== Subspecies ===
This article follows the IOC treatment with these three subspecies:

- T. g. glaucops (Kaup, 1852) – Hispaniola (Dominican Republic, Haiti) and surrounding islands
- T. g. nigrescens (Lawrence, 1878) – Dominica
- T. g. insularis (Pelzeln, 1872) – Saint Vincent to Grenada (southern Lesser Antilles)

== Description ==
The ashy-faced owl is 27 to 33 cm (11 to 13 in) long. Males weigh about 260 to 350 g (9.2 to 12 oz) and females about 460 to 540 g (16 to 19 oz). Adults of the nominate subspecies T. g. glaucops on Hispaniola have a silvery gray facial disc. Their upperparts are dark grayish brown with paler and dusky vermiculation. Their wings have buff or tawny mottling and their underparts are tawny with some darker barring. They have light, dark, and intermediate morphs. Their iris is blackish brown, their bill yellowish horn, and their legs and feet grayish brown. The ashy-faced owl is generally described as having a mix of red and brown coloration, long thin legs, a heart-shaped face, and silver-grey feathers. Juveniles are similar to adults with a darker gray face.

Subspecies T. g. insularis has a vinaceous-brown facial disc. Its upperparts are blackish gray with sparse white spots and streaks. Its wings are darker than its upperparts and have tawny mottling and feather edges. Its underparts are cinnamon-buff with dusky mottling and a few white spots. Subspecies T. g. nigrescens is very similar to insularis but has almost no white on its upperparts and less mottling on its underparts.

== Distribution and habitat ==
The nominate subspecies of the ashy-faced owl is found on the island of Hispaniola, which is shared by the Dominican Republic and Haiti, and on Île de la Tortue of the northwestern Haitian coast. T. g. insularis is found on the islands of St. Vincent, Bequia, Union, Carriacou, and Grenada in the southern Lesser Antilles. T. g. nigrescens is found on the island of Dominica in the north-central Lesser Antilles.

On Hispaniola, the ashy-faced owl inhabits a wide variety of landscapes, both natural and human-altered. The former include open woodlands, denser broadleaf forest, and scrublands. The latter includes farmlands, oil-palm plantations, solitary buildings, and villages and towns. Tyto glaucops is most often found in lowland areas, but can sometimes be found at higher elevations, such as foothills. In elevation it ranges from sea level to 2,000 m (6,600 ft). They have a preference for habitats that have a balance between open spaces for hunting and enough canopy cover for nesting. The ashy-faced owl is known for being solitary and territorial by nature. This requires them to inhabit large and undisturbed areas of land in order to maintain a stable population. The other two subspecies also use essentially all available habitats on their small islands.

== Ecology ==
The ashy-faced owl serves an ecological role as a nocturnal apex predator, helping to maintain the population of their prey items. Through their predatory behaviors, they serve an essential role in maintaining environmental balance in forests and agricultural ecosystems by curbing the small mammal, reptile, and amphibian populations.

=== Diet ===
The ashy-faced owl is primarily a nocturnal hunter, though in the absence of competing diurnal predators, some may hunt during the day. Its diet is mostly small vertebrates including mammals, birds, reptiles, and amphibians, but it also feeds on invertebrates.

=== Competition with American barn owl ===
A study published in 2010 compared the diets of ashy-faced and American barn owls (Tyto furcata pratincola) in the Dominican Republic, and it showed that ashy-faced owls exhibit dietary competition with the latter species, which established itself in Hispaniola around the 1950s. American barn owls had first arrived on Hispaniola around 1950. The author examined the regurgitated pellets the owls produce, which contain the undigested bones, fur, and feathers of their prey. It was found that they each consume over 100 species of prey, with 92 species being in common between the two. Small mammals predominated in both diets, particularly so in the American barn owl, and made up the greatest proportion of the biomass. Both caught a similar proportion of bats, but the ashy-faced owl caught more birds. Amphibians and reptiles were also consumed more often by the ashy-faced owl than by the American barn owl. This establishment led to a dietary overlap with the ashy faced owl population. This has led to competition and implications for resource partitioning and effects on the ecological niche stability of the ashy-faced owl. No conclusion could be reached as to whether the competition for food caused by the arrival of the American barn owl was detrimental to the native species.

== Behavior ==
=== Movement ===
The ashy-faced owl is a year-round resident throughout its range, though on Hispaniola young may disperse quite widely from their natal site.

=== Breeding ===
The nominate subspecies of the ashy-faced owl on Hispaniola breeds mostly between January and June. Eggs of T. g. nigrescens have been reported in September and nestlings in April. There are no data specific to the breeding season of T. g. insularis. The ashy-faced owl nests in cavities, both natural and human-made. Natural holes in tree trunks and branches, the walls of sinkholes, earthen banks, and cliffs are used. The ashy-faced owl has been shown to exhibit behaviors of using existing nests of other bird species such as the endemic palmchat (Dulus dominicus). This nesting choice is atypical for the Tytonidae family, displaying an opportunistic style of nest site selection. Opportunistic nesting demonstrates a flexibility in their nesting ecology, which is advantageous considering the limited habitat space on Hispaniola and its neighboring islands. The species also nests in human structures such as barns, church steeples, abandoned buildings, nest boxes provided for them, and even the attics of occupied dwellings. Ashy-faced owls have a preference for nests in secluded areas, including tree cavities and abandoned nests. These nesting choices seem to relate to decreased predation and increased fledgling survival .

=== Vocalization ===
On Hispaniola the ashy-faced owl makes a "hissing cry, prefaced by a series of higher-pitched ratchety clicks and a c. 2–3 seconds screeching call likened to criiisssssh. Other vocalizations of the nominate subspecies and those of the other two subspecies have not been well studied, but anecdotally include a wide variety of "screeches, wheezes, purrs, snores, twitters, hisses and yelps".

== Status ==
The IUCN has assessed the ashy-face owl as being of Least Concern. Though it has a somewhat limited range and its population size is not known, the latter is believed to be stable. No immediate threats have been identified. The species is "[w]idespread and locally common on Hispaniola." The "...status of Lesser Antillean subspecies [is] insufficiently known, but nigrescens appears to be common on Dominica, whereas insularis is rare on St Vincent and Grenada and in Grenadines, and might be vulnerable to habitat destruction and pesticide usage."
