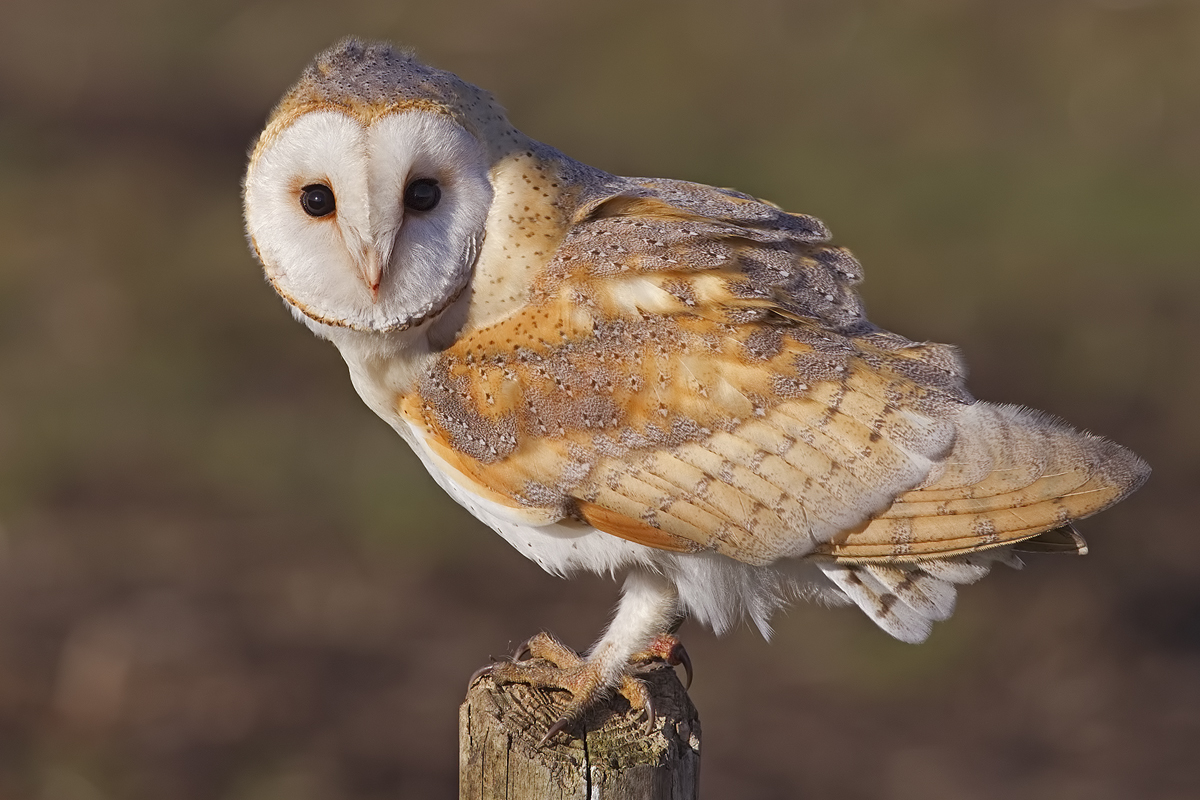
- Western barn owl in Lancashire, England
- Barn owl screeches recorded in Cardiganshire, Wales

Conservation status
- Least Concern (IUCN 3.1)
- CITES Appendix II

Scientific classification
- Kingdom: Animalia
- Phylum: Chordata
- Class: Aves
- Order: Strigiformes
- Family: Tytonidae
- Genus: Tyto
- Species: T. alba

Binomial name
- Tyto alba (Scopoli, 1769)

Subspecies
- Ten, see text
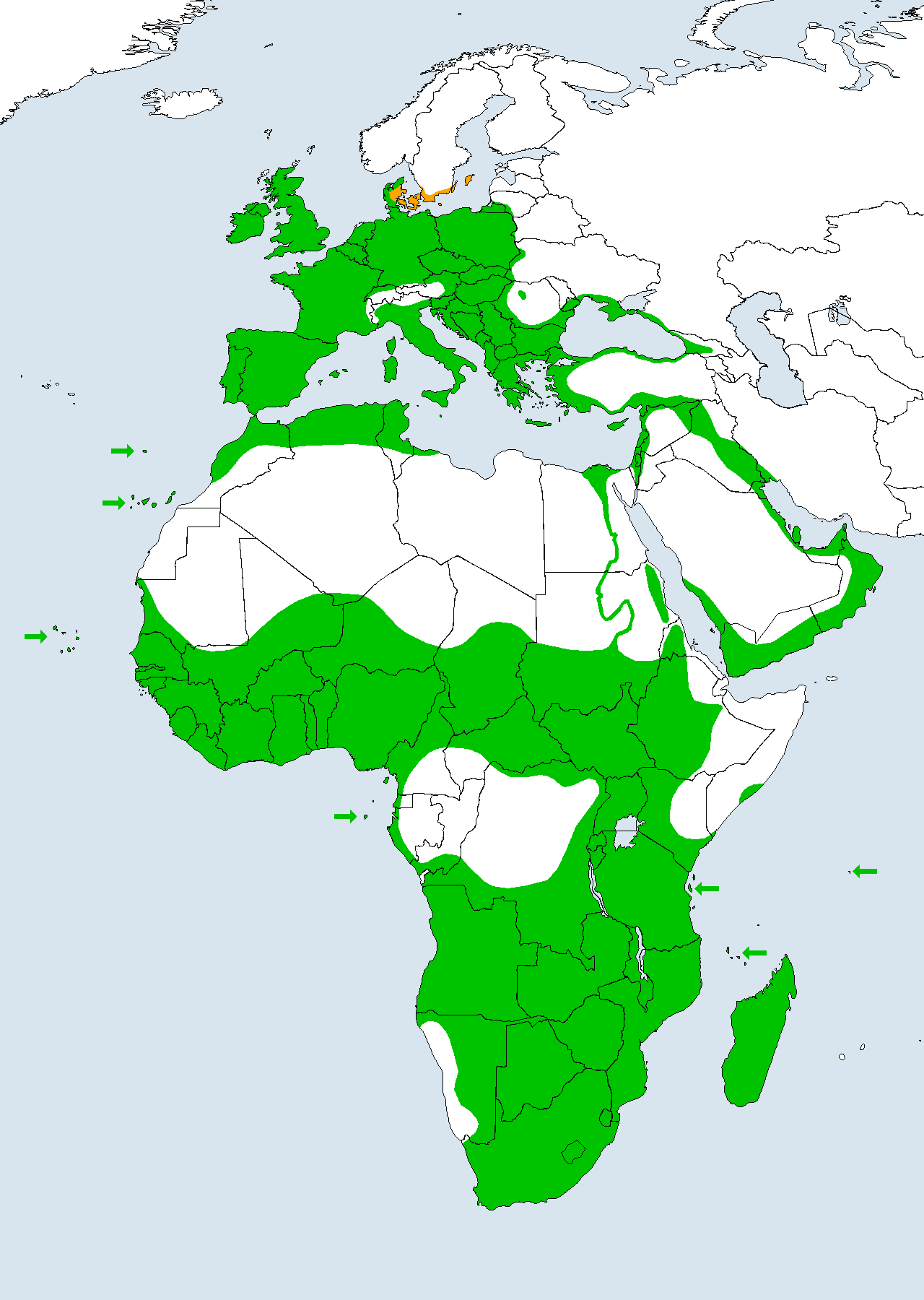
- *Green: resident *Orange: extinct populations

Synonyms
- Strix alba Scopoli, 1769

= Western barn owl =

Species of owl

The western barn owl (Tyto alba) is a species of barn owl native to Europe, southwestern Asia, and Africa. It was formerly considered a subspecies group together with barn owls native to other parts of the world, but this classification was found to be paraphyletic with respect to some other members of the genus.

The plumage on the head and back is a mottled shade of grey or brown; that on the underparts varies from white to brown and is sometimes speckled with dark markings. The facial disc is characteristically large and heart-shaped, with white plumage in most subspecies. This owl does not hoot, but utters an eerie, drawn-out screech.

The western barn owl is nocturnal over most of its range, but in Great Britain, it also hunts by day. Barn owls specialise in hunting animals on the ground, and nearly all of their food consists of small mammals, which they locate by sound, their hearing being very acute. The owls usually mate for life unless one of the pair is killed, whereupon a new pair bond may be formed. Breeding takes place at varying times of the year, according to the locality, with a clutch of eggs, averaging about four in number, being laid in a nest in a hollow tree, old building, or fissure in a cliff. When large numbers of small prey are readily available, barn owl populations can expand rapidly, and globally the barn owl is listed Least Concern on the IUCN Red List. Some subspecies with restricted ranges are more threatened.

== Taxonomy ==
The western barn owl was formally described in 1769 by the Italian naturalist Giovanni Antonio Scopoli under the binomial name Strix alba. The type locality is the Friuli area of northeast Italy. The specific epithet is from Latin albus meaning "white"; the species being much more extensively white than other owls known to Scopoli. This owl is now placed in the genus Tyto that was introduced in 1828 by the Swedish naturalist Gustaf Johan Billberg.

Until 2016–2018, the species Tyto alba was treated in a much broader sense, including barn owls throughout much of the world, but this arrangement was found by two studies to show deep genetic divergences and to be paraphyletic with respect to some other members of the genus, notably the ashy-faced owl Tyto glaucops from the Caribbean. This led to the breakup of the former broad view of Tyto alba into four species, now distinguished separately as the western barn owl T. alba (sensu stricto), the American barn owl T. furcata, the eastern barn owl T. javanica, and the Andaman masked owl T. deroepstorffi. A 2026 phylogeny study estimated that the western barn owl split off from the lineage leading to the American barn owl and the ashy-faced owl about 5.0 million years ago.

The bird is known by many common names that refer to its appearance, call, habitat, or its eerie, silent flight: white owl, silver owl, demon owl, ghost owl, death owl, night owl, rat owl, church owl, cave owl, stone owl, monkey-faced owl, hissing owl, hobgoblin or hobby owl, dobby owl, white-breasted owl, golden owl, screech owl, straw owl, barnyard owl, and delicate owl. "Golden owl" might also refer to the related golden masked owl (T. aurantia). "Hissing owl" and, particularly in the UK, "screech owl" refer to the piercing calls of these birds. The latter name is also applied to a different group of birds, the screech owls in the genus Megascops.

== Description ==
Western barn owl in flight in Birmingham, UK

The western barn owl is a medium-sized, pale-coloured owl with long wings and a short, squarish tail. The shape of the tail is a means of distinguishing the barn owl from true owls when seen in the air. Other distinguishing features are the undulating flight pattern and the dangling, feathered legs, which improves its ability to forage among dense foliage or beneath the snow and gives it a wide spread of talons when attacking prey. There is some size variation across the subspecies, with a typical specimen measuring about 33 to 35 cm (13 to 14 in) in overall length, with a wingspan of 80 to 95 cm (31 to 37 in). The sexes are broadly similar in weight, with females on average slightly heavier than males (typically about 10% heavier), but with considerable overlap. Compared to other owls of similar size, the western barn owl has a much higher metabolic rate, requiring relatively more food. The western barn owl flies silently; tiny serrations on the leading edges of its flight feathers and a hairlike fringe to the trailing edges help to break up the flow of air over the wings, thereby reducing turbulence and the noise that accompanies it. Hairlike extensions to the barbules of its feathers, which give the plumage a soft feel, also minimise noise produced during wingbeats.

The face with its heart shape and black eyes gives the flying bird a distinctive appearance, with oversized, oblique black eye-slits, the ridge of feathers above the bill somewhat resembling a nose. The species has acute hearing, with ears placed asymmetrically. This improves detection of sound position and distance and the bird does not require sight to hunt. The facial disc plays a part in this process, as is shown by the fact that with the ruff feathers removed, the bird can still locate the source in azimuth but fails to do so in elevation. On average within any one population, males tend to have fewer spots on the underside and are paler in colour than females. It is hypothesised plumage spottiness in female barn owls may signal parasite resistance. Species such as ectoparasitic flies and carnus hemapterus seem to be less abundant on young raised by more heavily spotted females, and is often a trait a male may seek for. In an experiment where clutches were cross-fostered between nests, the amount of the flies collected on nestlings was negatively correlated with the genetic mother's plumage spots. Nestlings are covered in white down, but the heart-shaped facial disk becomes visible soon after hatching. Both leucistic and melanistic western barn owls have been recorded in the wild and in captivity, with melanistic individuals estimated to occur with odds of 1 out of every 100,000 birds.

Western barn owl nocturnal flight call in the Netherlands

Contrary to popular belief, the western barn owl does not hoot, but produces a characteristic piercing shree scream, an eerie, long-drawn-out shriek. Males in courtship give a shrill twitter. Both young and old can hiss like a snake to scare away intruders. Other sounds produced include a purring chirrup, denoting pleasure, and a "kee-yak", which resembles one of the vocalisations of the tawny owl. When captured or cornered, the western barn owl throws itself on its back and flails with sharp-taloned feet, making for an effective defence. In such situations, it may emit rasping sounds or clicking snaps, produced probably by the bill but possibly by the tongue.

=== Geographic variation ===
The western barn owl's head and upper body typically vary between pale brown and some shade of grey, especially on the forehead and back in most subspecies. Some are purer, richer brown instead, and all have fine black-and-white speckles, except on the remiges and rectrices, which are light brown with darker bands. The heart-shaped face is usually bright white, but in some subspecies it is brown. The underparts, including the tarsometatarsal (lower leg) feathers, vary from white to reddish buff among the subspecies and are either mostly unpatterned or bear a varying number of tiny blackish-brown speckles. It has been found that at least in the continental European populations, females with more spotting are healthier than plainer birds. This does not hold true for European males by contrast, where the spotting varies according to subspecies. The bill varies from pale horn to dark buff, corresponding to the general plumage hue, and the iris is blackish brown. The toes, like the bill, vary in colour, ranging from pink to dark pinkish-grey, and the talons are black.

== Distribution and habitat ==
The western barn owl is native to most of Europe, West Asia and Africa. The densest clusters are in Western and Central Europe and in countries bordering the Mediterranean Sea. Some smaller clusters are present in East Africa and Madagascar. In Ghana and the wider West African region, it occurs in small scattered pockets. The species was introduced by humans to parts of the Pacific islands and Malaysia to control rat populations. In 2025, the western barn owl was reintroduced to Montjuïc hill in Barcelona as part of the Barcelona Nature Plan and the Climate Plan.

The western barn owl inhabits open wetlands and grasslands, savannas, heathlands and deciduous shrublands up to an elevation of 4,000 m (13,000 ft), but also agricultural landscapes and peri-urban areas.

Ten geographical subspecies are currently accepted:

Subspecies	Description	Range	Synonyms
T. a. alba (Scopoli, 1769)	Upperparts grey and light buff. Underparts white, with few if any black spots; males often appear entirely unspotted.	Western Europe from the British Isles south to Iberia and the Maghreb, and east along Mediterranean coastal regions to northwestern Turkey in the north and the Nile in the south, where it reaches upstream to northeastern Sudan. Also the Aïr Mountains in the Sahara of Niger, the Balearic Islands and Sicily in the Mediterranean, and the western Canary Islands (El Hierro, La Gomera, La Palma, Gran Canaria, and Tenerife). Intergrades with T. a. guttata from the Balkans through Hungary and along the Rhine and lower Meuse rivers, and with T. a. poensis around the Egypt-Sudan border.	common barn owl; includes T. a. hostilis, T. a. kirchhoffi, T. a. kleinschmidti and T. a. pusillus. African populations might belong to T. a. erlangeri.
T. a. guttata (C. L. Brehm, 1831)	More grey on upperparts than T. a. alba. Underparts buff to rufous with some dark speckles (more than in T. a. alba). Face whitish. Females are on average redder below than males.	Central Europe north of the Alps from the Rhine to Latvia, Lithuania and Ukraine, and south to Romania, northeastern Greece and the southern Balkans. Intergrades with T. a. alba at the western border of its range.	Includes T. a. rhenana.
T. a. ernesti (Kleinschmidt, 1901)	Similar to T. a. alba; breast region always pure unspotted white.	Endemic to Corsica and Sardinia in the Mediterranean.	
T. a. erlangeri (W. L. Sclater, 1921)	Similar to T. a. ernesti; upperparts lighter and yellower.	Crete and the southern Aegean islands to Cyprus; the Near and Middle East including the Arabian Peninsula coastlands, south to Sinai and east to the southwestern Iranian Plateau.	Might include African populations assigned to T. a. alba.
T. a. schmitzi (E. Hartert, 1900)	Small. Similar to T. a. guttata, but breast region light buff.	Endemic to Madeira and Porto Santo Island in the eastern Atlantic.	
T. a. gracilirostris (E. Hartert, 1905)	Small. Similar to T. a. schmitzi but breast darker, approaching T. a. guttata. Face light buff.	Endemic to the eastern Canary Islands (Chinijo Archipelago, Fuerteventura, Lanzarote; perhaps formerly also on Lobos).	Canary Islands barn owl
T. a. detorta (E. Hartert, 1913)	Similar to T. a. guttata, but less reddish. Face buff.	Endemic to the Cape Verde Islands.	Cape Verde barn owl; sometimes considered a separate species
T. a. poensis (Fraser, 1842)	Upperparts golden-brown and grey with very bold pattern. Underparts light buff with extensive speckles. Face white.	Described from to Bioko in the Gulf of Guinea, but includes all subsaharan African populations	T. a. affinis (Blyth, 1862).
T. a. thomensis (Hartlaub, 1852)	Smallish. Upperparts dark brownish grey with bold pattern, including lighter brown bands on remiges and rectrices. Underparts golden brown with extensive speckles. Face buff.	Endemic to São Tomé Island. A record from Príncipe is in error.	São Tomé barn owl; sometimes considered a separate species.
T. a. hypermetra Grote, 1928	Similar to T. a. poensis, but supposedly lighter on average. Upperparts very grey. Underparts light buff with extensive speckles. Face white.	Comoros and Madagascar	

== Fossil record ==
Accumulations of bones of rodents and other micromammals strongly suspected to have been made by the Western barn owl are known from the fossil site of Swartkrans in South Africa dating back to the Early Pleistocene.

== Behaviour and ecology ==
Two Western Barn Owls (Tyto alba) just after midnight at waterhole, seen from Kgalagadi Transfrontier Park, South Africa

Like most owls, the barn owl is crepuscular to nocturnal, relying on its acute sense of hearing when hunting in complete darkness. It often becomes active shortly before dusk and can be seen during the day when relocating from one roosting site to another. In Britain, it sometimes hunts by day. This practice may depend on whether the owl is mobbed by other birds if it emerges in daylight. However, in Britain, some western barn owls continue to hunt by day even when mobbed by birds like the Eurasian magpie, rook and black-headed gull, such diurnal activity possibly occurring when the previous night has been wet or windy making hunting difficult. By contrast, in southern Europe and the tropics, the birds seem to be almost exclusively nocturnal, with the few birds that hunt by day being severely mobbed. Sometimes other birds such as jackdaws (Corvus monedula) nest in the same hollow tree or building and seem to live harmoniously with the owls.

The barn owl hunts by flying slowly, quartering the ground and hovering over spots that may conceal prey. It may also use branches, fence posts or other lookouts to scan its surroundings, and this is the main means of prey location. The bird has long, broad wings, enabling it to manoeuvre and turn abruptly. The western barn owl prefers to hunt along the edges of woods or in rough grass strips adjoining pasture. It has an effortless wavering flight as it quarters the ground, alert to the sounds made by potential prey. The behaviour and ecological preferences may differ slightly even among neighbouring subspecies, as shown in the case of the European T. a. guttata and T. a. alba that probably evolved allopatrically, in glacial refugia in southeastern Europe and in Iberian Peninsula or southern France, respectively.

=== Diet and feeding ===
Western barn owl in Colchester Zoo

Hunting nocturnally or crepuscularly, this bird can target its prey and dive to the ground, penetrating its talons through snow, grass or brush to seize small creatures with deadly accuracy. The diet of the western barn owl has been much studied; the items consumed can be ascertained from identifying the prey fragments in the pellets of indigestible matter that the bird regurgitates. Small prey is usually torn into chunks and eaten completely including bones and fur while prey larger than about 100 g (3.5 oz) are usually dismembered and the inedible parts discarded. Excess food is often cached at roosting sites and can be used when food is scarce. Nestlings tend to vocalise more when hungry than satiated, with the one that vocalises most intensely often eating the prey delivered by a parent.

Studies of diet have been made in most parts of the bird's range, and in moist temperate areas over 90% of the prey tends to be small mammals. Locally superabundant rodent species in the weight class of several grams per individual usually make up the single largest proportion of prey. small Soricomorpha like Suncus shrews may be a secondary prey of major importance. It relies largely on rodents as prey. Pellets studied in northern Jordan contained a high amount of Tristram's jird remains. In Ireland, the accidental introduction of the bank vole in the 1950s led to a major shift in the western barn owl's diet: the vole is now by far the largest prey item where their ranges overlap. Regionally, non-rodent foods are used as per availability. In hot, dry, unproductive areas, the proportion of rodent is lower, and a great variety of other creatures are eaten depending on local abundance. Reptile species such as the Tarentola mauritanica are consumed in the Southern Europe region due to the higher ambient temperatures allowing reptiles to be active at night. On the Cape Verde Islands, geckos are the mainstay of the western barn owl's diet, supplemented by birds such as plovers, godwits, turnstones, weavers and pratincoles.

=== Breeding ===
Barn owls living in tropical regions can breed at any time of year, but some seasonality in nesting is still evident. Where there are distinct wet and dry seasons, egg-laying usually takes place during the dry season, with increased rodent prey becoming available to the birds as the vegetation dies off. In arid regions, breeding may be irregular and may happen in wet periods, triggered by temporary increases in the populations of small mammals. In temperate climates, nesting seasons become more distinct and there are some seasons of the year when no egg-laying takes place. In Europe, most nesting takes place between March and June when temperatures are increasing. The actual dates of egg-laying vary by year and by location, being correlated with the amount of prey-rich foraging habitat around the nest site and often with the phase of the rodent abundance cycle. An increase in rodent populations will usually stimulate the local barn owls to begin nesting; thus, even in the cooler parts of its range, two broods are often raised in a good year.

Females are ready to breed at 10 to 11 months of age, although males sometimes wait until the following year. Western barn owls are usually monogamous, sticking to one partner for life unless one of the pair dies. During the non-breeding season they may roost separately, but as the breeding season approaches they return to their established nesting site, showing considerable site fidelity. In colder climates, in harsh weather and where winter food supplies may be scarce, they may roost in farm buildings and in barns between hay bales, but they then run the risk that their selected nesting hole may be taken over by some other, earlier-nesting species. Single males may establish feeding territories, patrolling the hunting areas, occasionally stopping to hover, and perching on lofty eminences where they screech to attract a mate. Where a female has lost her mate but maintained her breeding site, she usually seems to manage to attract a new spouse.

Once a pair-bond has been formed, the male will make short flights at dusk around the nesting and roosting sites and then longer circuits to establish a home range. When he is later joined by the female, there is much chasing, turning and twisting in flight, and frequent screeches, the male's being high-pitched and tremulous and the female's lower and harsher. At later stages of courtship, the male emerges at dusk, climbs high into the sky and then swoops back to the vicinity of the female at speed. He then sets off to forage. The female meanwhile sits in an eminent position and preens, returning to the nest a minute or two before the male arrives with food for her. Such feeding behaviour of the female by the male is common, helps build the pair-bond and increases the female's fitness before egg-laying commences.

=== Nesting ===
Auob Riverbed, Kgalagadi Transfrontier Park, South Africa

The western barn owl is a cavity nester; it chooses holes in trees, fissures in cliff faces, the large nests of other birds such as the hamerkop (Scopus umbrett.) Due to a declining number of suitable hollow trees, it uses the cavities that human-made structures provide such as farm sheds and church towers. Modifications such as sealing the church against unwanted pests may have the consequence of leading to casualty to nesting western barn owls and their chicks. No nesting material is used as such but, as the female sits incubating the eggs, she draws in the dry furry material of which her regurgitated pellets are composed, so that by the time the chicks are hatched, they are surrounded by a carpet of shredded pellets.

Before commencing laying, the female spends much time near the nest and is entirely provisioned by the male. Meanwhile, the male roosts nearby and may cache any prey that is surplus to their requirements. When the female has reached peak weight, the male provides a ritual presentation of food and copulation occurs at the nest. The female lays eggs on alternate days and the clutch size averages about five eggs (range two to nine). The eggs are chalky white, somewhat elliptical and about the size of bantam chicken eggs, and incubation begins as soon as the first egg is laid. While she is sitting on the nest, the male is constantly bringing more provisions and they may pile up beside the female. The incubation period is about thirty days, hatching takes place over a prolonged period and the youngest chick may be several weeks younger than its oldest sibling. In years with plentiful supplies of food, there may be a hatching success rate of about 75%.

In cases of late offspring desertion by the female, the male is able to care of the brood alone. Barn owls are not particularly territorial but have a home range inside which they forage. For males in Scotland this has a radius of about 1 km (0.62 mi) from the nest site and an average size of about 300 hectares. Female home ranges largely coincide with that of their mates. Outside the breeding season, males and females usually roost separately, each one having about three favoured sites in which to conceal themselves by day, and which are also visited for short periods during the night. Roosting sites include holes in trees, fissures in cliffs, disused buildings, chimneys and haysheds and are often small in comparison to nesting sites. As the breeding season approaches, the birds move back to the vicinity of the chosen nest to roost.

=== Predators and parasites ===
The Eurasian eagle-owl (Bubo bubo) is a predator of the Western barn owl. In Africa, the principal predators of Western barn owls are Verreaux's eagle-owls (Ketupa lactea) and Cape eagle-owls (Bubo capensis). In Europe, although less dangerous than the eagle owl, the chief diurnal predators are the Eurasian goshawk (Astur gentilis) and the common buzzard (Buteo buteo). About a dozen other large diurnal raptors and owls have also been reported as predators of barn owls, ranging from the larger tawny owl (Strix aluco) up to the golden eagle (Aquila chrysaetos). The goshawk and the eagle-owl are on the increase because of the greater protection these birds now receive. When disturbed at its roosting site, an angry western barn owl lowers its head and sways it from side to side, or the head may be lowered and stretched forward and the wings drooped while the bird emits hisses and makes snapping noises with its beak. A defensive attitude involves lying flat on the ground or crouching with wings spread out.

=== Lifespan ===
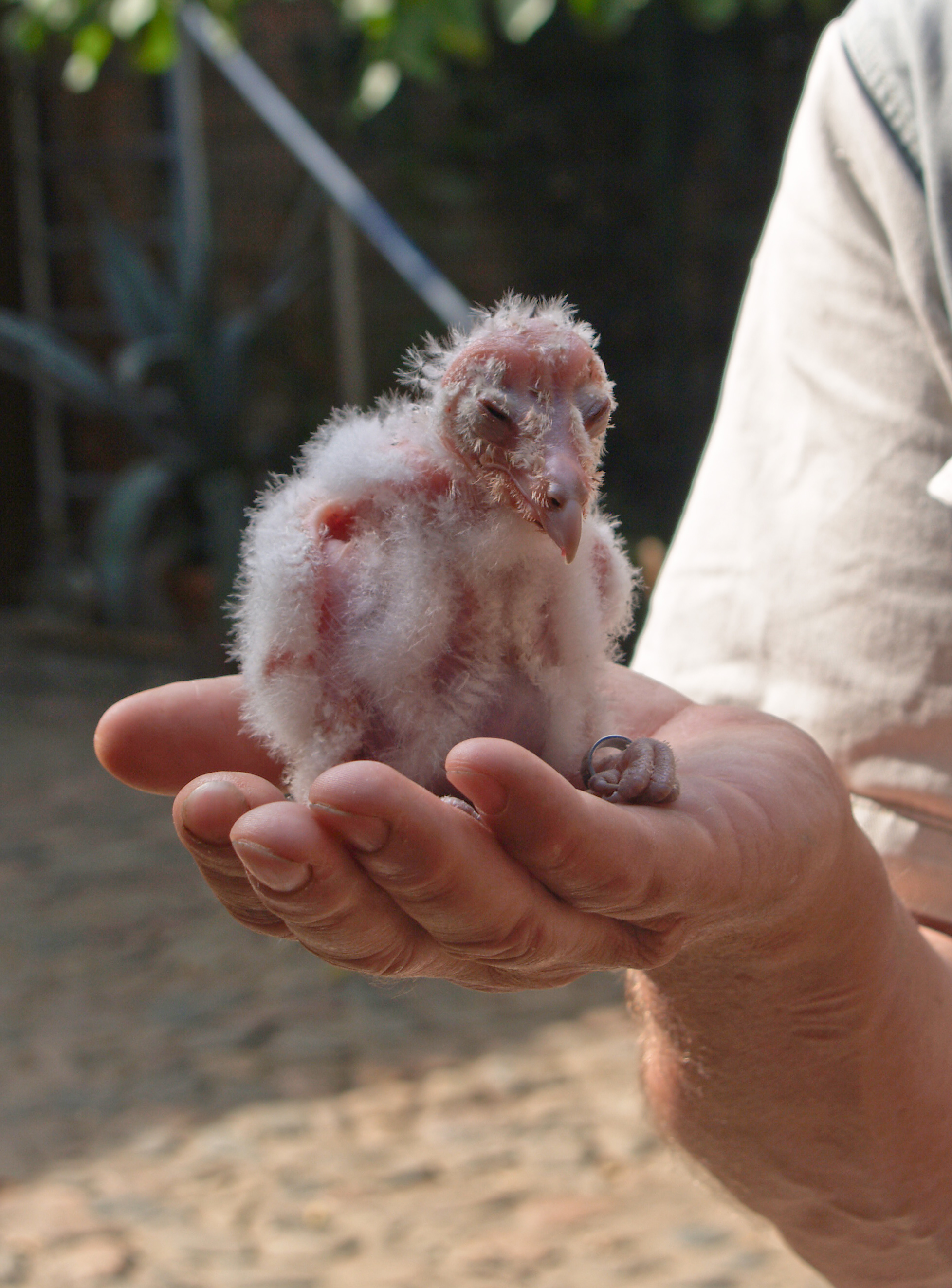
10-day old chick of a barn owl

Unusually for such a medium-sized carnivorous animal, the barn owl exhibits r-selection, producing large number of offspring with a high growth rate, many of which have a relatively low probability of surviving to adulthood. Chicks are at first covered with greyish-white down and develop rapidly. Within a week they can hold their heads up and shuffle around in the nest. The female tears up the food brought by the male and distributes it to the chicks. By two weeks old they are already half their adult weight and look naked as the amount of down is insufficient to cover their growing bodies. By three weeks old, quills are starting to push through the skin and the chicks stand, making snoring noises with wings raised and tail stumps waggling, begging for food items which are now given whole. The male is the main provider of food until all the chicks are at least four weeks old at which time the female begins to leave the nest and starts to roost elsewhere. By the sixth week the chicks are as big as the adults but have slimmed down somewhat by the ninth week when they are fully fledged and start leaving the nest briefly themselves. They are still dependent on the parent birds until about thirteen weeks and receive training from the female in finding, and eventually catching, prey.

While wild barn owls are decidedly short-lived, the actual longevity of the species is much higher; captive individuals may reach twenty years of age or more. But occasionally, wild birds can also reach advanced ages. One in Nottinghamshire was still alive at 18 years 2 days on 25 June 2025, while a Dutch owl was noted to have reached an age of 17 years, 10 months. Another captive barn owl, in England lived to be over 25 years old. Taking into account such extremely long-lived individuals, the average lifespan of the barn owl is about four years, and statistically two-thirds to three-quarters of all adults survive from one year to the next. However, the mortality is not evenly distributed throughout the bird's life, and only one young in three manages to live to its first breeding attempt. The most significant cause of death in temperate areas is likely to be starvation, particularly over the autumn and winter period when first year birds are still perfecting their hunting skills. In northern and upland areas, there is some correlation between mortality in older birds and adverse weather, deep-lying snow and prolonged low temperatures.

== Conservation ==
Nesting box erected in Norfolk

The western barn owl is relatively common throughout most of its range and is not considered globally threatened. While barn owls are prolific breeders and able to recover from short-term population decreases, they are not as common in some areas as they used to be. A 1995–1997 survey put their British population at between 3,000 and 5,000 breeding pairs, out of an average of about 150,000 pairs in the whole of Europe. In the European Community they are considered a Species of European Concern. Genetically diverse populations allow the species to be more climate change adaptive and allow the species to fill a broader niche in the environment. Collisions with cars is a cause of mortality, and may result when the bird is foraging on mown road verges; fledglings are at a greater risk than adults.

Modern agricultural mechanisation has affected the barn owl from less numbers of hedgerows to intensive grazing on rough grassland decreasing the numbers of small prey. Local declines from organochlorine pesticide like DDT poisoning in the mid-20th century and second hand exposure from rodenticides in the late 20th century onwards. In a 12 year monitoring study conducted in the United Kingdom, around 85% of barn owls carry very low amounts of rodenticides. In May 2012, it was revealed that farmers in Israel and Jordan had replaced pesticides with barn owls in a joint conservation venture called "Project Barn Owl" over a period of ten years. This project has also been adapted by the Palestinian Authority, Egypt, Morocco, Cyprus, and Greece, promoting regional cooperation via a shared environmental goal. Rodents make up almost all of the western barn owl's diet, making them the perfect "exterminators." This also benefits other birds, since pesticides are toxic and deadly to many nesting species. From 1999 to 2012, Populations from East Poland farms disappeared alongside Athene noctua. The most common factors leading to the decline was the demolition of the buildings the owl occupied and abandonment of animal production by farmers. This effect was seen more greatly on farms where residential and industrial infrastructure occupied a smaller area. However, the provision of nest boxes under the eaves of buildings and in other locations can be very successful in increasing the local population. For example, in the United Kingdom, the "Barn Owl Nest Box Scheme" is promoted by the World Owl Trust, This scheme has many participants in local areas such as Somerset, where a webcam has been set up inside a nest box in which seven young were reared in 2014. Other factors can lead to individual fatalities such as collisions with electrical wires, drowning in water containers, or entrapment in vertical hollow objects or buildings.

The Canary barn owl is particularly at risk, and as late as 1975, hunting by fearful locals limited the population on Fuerteventura left only a few pairs left. On Lanzarote a somewhat larger number of these birds still seem to exist, but altogether this particular subspecies is precariously rare. Due to their assignment to the nominate subspecies, which is commonly found in mainland Spain, the western Canary Islands population is not classified as threatened.

== In culture ==
Stamps of Lithuania, 2014-08

It is mentioned in Shakespeare’s play A Midsummer Night's Dream; 'Whil'st the scritch-owle, scritching loud, puts the wretch that lies in woe, in remembrance of a shroud.' In Britain, it was thought that hearing the scream of a barn owl predicted a storm was coming. However, the type of weather differs depending on the region. In England, the owl’s call meant hailstones while in Glamorgan it was said to foretell snow and in Scotland meant rain. A broth of the bird was thought to be a cure for whooping cough for children in Yorkshire, while the sound of the screech in Wales meant the loss of a girl’s virginity. Some superstitions say that if barn owls appear before childbirth, the sight meant the child will have ill fortune brought to them. There are variations to the myth within Europe. In France, if a barn owl shrieks on the chimney where a woman resides, her future child will be a girl with ill fortune. In Donegal, Ireland, women who thought they could sing but had a screeching, high-pitched song were called a scréachóg reilige, which relates to that of a barn owl. The species was often killed and nailed to the front doors of farm buildings in Europe. In places such as France and Switzerland, the tradition continued as late as the 1960s due to the strong belief the bird’s presence kept livestock safe from curses or warded lightning away. In 1979, the sighting of a human-like owl creature named ‘Owlman’ or ‘Mawnan’ in Cornwall may have actually been that of a barn owl.
