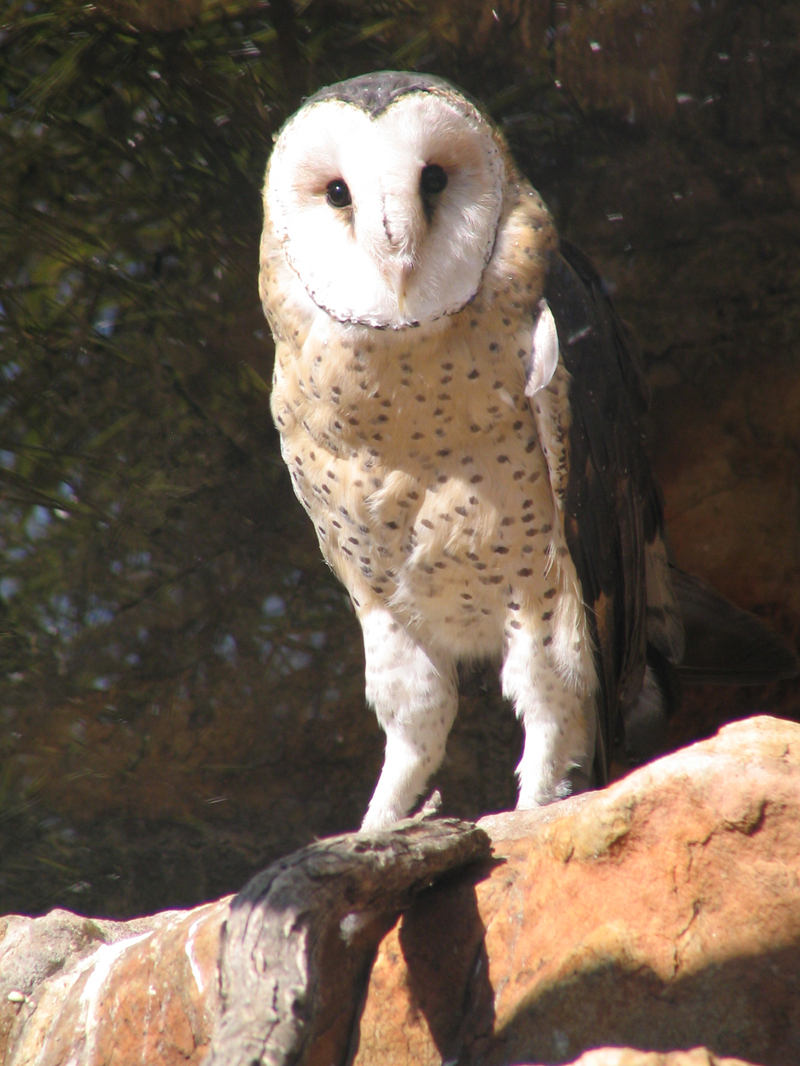
- African grass owl, Tyto capensis The "grass owls" are two rather long-legged species of Tyto.
- Western barn owl sounds

Scientific classification
- Kingdom: Animalia
- Phylum: Chordata
- Class: Aves
- Order: Strigiformes
- Family: Tytonidae
- Subfamily: Tytoninae
- Genus: Tyto; Billberg, 1828

Type species
- Strix flammea (now Tyto alba) Linnaeus, 1766

Species
- see text

Synonyms
- Lechusa Miller, 1956; Strix sensu auct. non Linnaeus, 1758 – preoccupied

= Tyto =

Tyto Temporal range: Late Miocene–Recent

Genus of birds

Tyto is a genus of owls in the family Tytonidae. Depending on the species and the locality, common names include barn owl, common barn owl, grass owl, sooty owl, masked owl, or field owl. It is the most widely distributed genus of owls in the world and one of the most widespread of all genera of birds, living almost everywhere except for polar and desert regions, Asia north of the Himalayas, some Indonesian islands and some Pacific Islands.

The genus comprises three widespread continental species and many island species including the extinct island species. The widespread species comprise: western barn owl of Europe, western Asia and Africa, the eastern barn owl of Southeast Asia and Australasia, and the American barn owl of the Americas. However, some taxonomic authorities classify barn owls differently, and unify all continental barn owls in to one species. Further research is needed clarify the taxonomies.

There is considerable variation of size and colour among the many species and sub-subspecies, but most are between 33 and 39 cm (13 and 15 in) in length, with wingspans ranging from 80 to 95 cm (31 to 37 in). The plumage on the head and back is a mottled shade of grey or brown; that on the underparts varies from white to brown and is sometimes speckled with dark markings. The facial disc is characteristically large and heart-shaped, with white plumage in most subspecies. This owl does not hoot, but utters an eerie, drawn-out screech.

The species of this genus are nocturnal over most of its range, but in Great Britain and some Pacific Islands, it also hunts by day. Barn owls specialise in hunting animals on the ground, and nearly all of their food consists of small mammals, which they locate by sound, their hearing being very acute. The owls usually mate for life unless one of the pair is killed, whereupon a new pair bond may be formed. Breeding takes place at varying times of the year, according to the locality, with a clutch of eggs, averaging about four in number, being laid in a nest in a hollow tree, old building, or fissure in a cliff. The female does all the incubation, and she and the young chicks are reliant on the male for food. When large numbers of small prey are readily available, barn owl populations can expand rapidly, and globally the barn owl is listed Least Concern on the IUCN Red List. Some subspecies with restricted ranges are more threatened.

== Taxonomy ==
The genus Tyto was introduced in 1828 by the Swedish naturalist Gustaf Johan Billberg with the Tyto alba as the type species. The name is from the Ancient Greek tutō meaning "owl".

The barn owl (Tyto alba) was formerly considered to have a global distribution with around 28 subspecies. In the list of birds maintained by Frank Gill, Pamela Rasmussen and David Donsker on behalf of the International Ornithological Committee (IOC) the genus is now split into four species: the western barn owl (Tyto alba) (10 subspecies), the American barn owl (Tyto furcata) (12 subspecies), the eastern barn owl (Tyto javanica) (7 subspecies) and the Andaman masked owl (Tyto deroepstorffi). This arrangement is followed here. Support for this split was provided by a molecular phylogenetic study by Vera Uva and collaborators published in 2018 that compared the DNA sequences of three mitochondrial and one nuclear loci. This split was eventually adopted by other taxonomic authorities such as the American Ornithological Society and the Clements Checklist of Birds of the World maintained by members of Cornell University in 2024, but as of May 2025 has yet to be accepted by the list maintained by BirdLife International that is used by the International Union for Conservation of Nature.

The cladogram below is based on the 2018 phylogenetic study. The Andaman masked owl (Tyto deroepstorffi) and Itombwe owl (Tyto prigoginei) were not sampled. The Manus masked owl (Tyto manusi) was embedded in a clade with subspecies of the Australian masked owl.

- Tyto
  - - - Minahasa masked owl (Tyto inexspectata)
      - - Eastern grass owl (Tyto longimembris)
        - African grass owl (Tyto capensis)
    - - - Greater sooty owl (Tyto tenebricosa)
        - Lesser sooty owl (Tyto multipunctata)
      - - Golden masked owl (Tyto aurantia)
        - - Moluccan masked owl (Tyto sororcula)
          - Australian masked owl (Tyto novaehollandiae)
  - - Red owl (Tyto soumagnei)
    - - - Sulawesi masked owl (Tyto rosenbergii)
        - - Eastern barn owl (Tyto javanica)
          - Taliabu masked owl (Tyto nigrobrunnea)
      - - Western barn owl (Tyto alba)
        - - Ashy-faced owl (Tyto glaucops)
          - American barn owl (Tyto furcata)

A 2026 phylogeny of 15 Tyto species found that the genus's last common ancestor might have ranged across Africa, Eurasia and Oceania. It further found it had two main clades: the grass and masked owls, and the red owl, the common barn owls and the ashy-faced owl. Throughout their evolutionary history, Tyto owls have shown a better capability to colonize islands than other owls. Several such island forms have become extinct, some long ago, but some in comparatively recent times. A number of insular barn owls from the Mediterranean and the Caribbean were very large or truly gigantic species.

=== Extant species ===
Seventeen species are recognized:

Image	Common name	Scientific name	Distribution
	Greater sooty owl	Tyto tenebricosa	Australia
	Lesser sooty owl	Tyto multipunctata	Australia
	Minahasa masked owl	Tyto inexspectata	Sulawesi, Indonesia
	Taliabu masked owl	Tyto nigrobrunnea	Sula Islands, Maluku, Indonesia
	Moluccan masked owl	Tyto sororcula	south Moluccas of Indonesia
	Manus masked owl	Tyto manusi	Manus Island in the Admiralty Islands
	Golden masked owl	Tyto aurantia	the island of New Britain, Papua New Guinea
	Australian masked owl	Tyto novaehollandiae	Southern New Guinea and the non-desert areas of Australia.
	Sulawesi masked owl	Tyto rosenbergii	the Indonesian islands of Sulawesi, Sangihe and Peleng
	Red owl	Tyto soumagnei	Madagascar
	Western barn owl	Tyto alba	Eurasia and Africa.
	American barn owl	Tyto furcata	the Americas
	Eastern barn owl	Tyto javanica	southeast Asia and Australasia.
	Andaman masked owl	Tyto deroepstorffi	southern Andaman Islands
	Ashy-faced owl	Tyto glaucops	Hispaniola (Haiti and the Dominican Republic).
	African grass owl	Tyto capensis	southern Congo and northern Angola to the central coast of Mozambique and the other centred on South Africa from the Western Cape north to the southern extremities of Zimbabwe, Botswana and Mozambique up to Kenya and Ethiopia.
	Eastern grass owl	Tyto longimembris	eastern, southern and southeast Asia, parts of New Guinea, Australia (mainly in Queensland) and the western Pacific
	Itombwe owl	Tyto prigoginei	Itombwe Mountains in the eastern Democratic Republic of Congo

=== Extinct species ===
Known from ancient fossils

- Tyto sanctialbani (Middle - Late Miocene of Central Europe) - formerly in Strix; includes T. campiterrae
- Tyto robusta (Late Miocene/Early Pliocene of the Gargano Peninsula, Italy)
- Tyto gigantea (Late Miocene/Early Pliocene of the Gargano Peninsula, Italy)
- Tyto balearica (Late Miocene - Middle Pleistocene of the west-central Mediterranean)
- Tyto mourerchauvireae (Middle Pleistocene of Sicily, Mediterranean)
- Tyto jinniushanensis (Pleistocene of Jing Niu Shan, China)
- Tyto maniola – Cuban Dwarf Barn Owl (Late Pleistocene of Cuba)
- Tyto richae (Early Pliocene of South Africa)
- Tyto sp. 1
- Tyto sp. 2

Late prehistoric extinctions usually known from subfossil remains

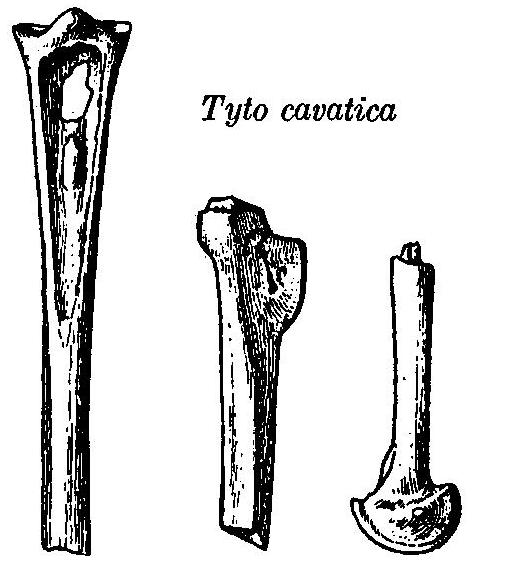
Fossils of Tyto cavatica

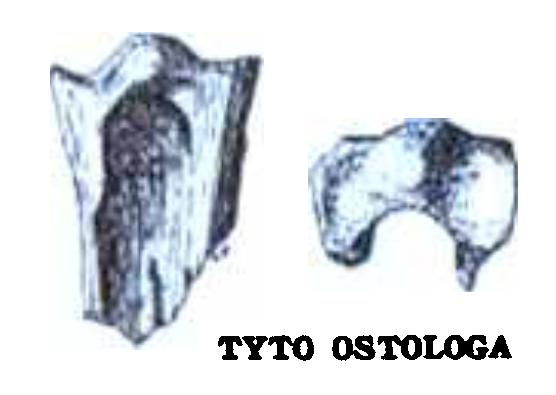
Fossil of Tyto ostologa

- Mussau barn owl (Tyto cf. novaehollandiae) found in Mussau
- New Ireland greater barn owl (Tyto cf. novaehollandiae) found in New Ireland
- New Ireland lesser barn owl (Tyto cf. alba/aurantiaca) found in New Ireland
- New Caledonian barn owl (Tyto letocarti) found in New Caledonia - tentatively placed here
- Puerto Rican barn owl (Tyto cavatica) found in Puerto Rico - may still have existed up to 1912; possibly a subspecies of the ashy-faced owl (Tyto glaucops)
- Noel's barn owl (Tyto noeli) found in Cuba
- Rivero's barn owl (Tyto riveroi) found in Cuba
- Cuban barn owl (Tyto sp.) found in Cuba
- Hispaniolan barn owl (Tyto ostologa) found in Hispaniola
- Bahaman barn owl (Tyto pollens) found in Little Exuma, New Providence, and maybe Andros Island, the Bahamas - may have survived into the 16th century
- Barbuda barn owl (Tyto neddi) found in Barbuda and possibly Antigua
- Maltese barn owl (Tyto melitensis) found in Malta - formerly in Strix; possibly a paleosubspecies of Tyto alba

=== Former species ===
A number of owl fossils were at one time assigned to the present genus, but are nowadays placed elsewhere. While there are clear differences in osteology between typical owls and barn owls, there has been parallel evolution to some degree and thus isolated fossil bones cannot necessarily be assigned to either family without thorough study. Notably, the genus Strix has been misapplied by many early scientists as a "wastebasket taxon" for many owls, including Tyto.

- Tyto antiqua (Late Eocene/Early Oligocene of Quercy? - Early Miocene of France) was a barn owl of the prehistoric genus Prosybris; this taxon might be a nomen nudum, as the species was originally described in Strix, this requires confirmation
- Tyto edwardsi (Late Miocene of Grive-Saint-Alban, France) was a strigid owl, but has not yet been reliably identified to a genus; it might belong in Strix or the European Ninox-like group.
- Tyto ignota (Middle Miocene of Sansan, France) was a strigid owl of unclear affinities; while it might belong into Strix, this requires confirmation
- "TMT 164", a distal left tarsometatarsus of a supposed Tyto from the Middle Miocene Grive-Saint-Alban (France); might also belong in Prosybris, as it is similar to Tyto antiqua

== Description ==
They are darker on the back than the front, usually an orange-brown colour, the front being a paler version of the back or mottled, although there is considerable variation even amongst species. Tyto owls have a divided, heart-shaped facial disc, and lack the ear-like tufts of feathers found in many other owls. Tyto owls tend to be larger than bay owls. The name tyto (τυτώ) is onomatopeic Greek for owl.
