= Guardians of Ga'Hoole =

Novel series by Kathryn Lasky

- The official logo for Guardians of Ga'Hoole
- Author: Kathryn Lasky
- Illustrator: Richard Cowdrey
- Country: United States
- Language: English
- Genre: Fantasy fiction
- Publisher: Scholastic Corporation
- Published: 2003–2013
- Media type: Print (Paperback and Hardback)
- No. of books: 31 (including spin-offs and companion books)

Guardians of Ga'Hoole is a fantasy book series written by Kathryn Lasky and published by Scholastic. The series contains a total of 16 books, and although it was originally intended to conclude with the 2008 publication of The War of the Ember, it has a prequel, The Rise of a Legend, published in 2013. Apart from the main series, there are a few more books and spin-offs set in the same universe. The first three books of the series were adapted into the 2010 animated 3D film Legend of the Guardians: The Owls of Ga'Hoole, directed by Zack Snyder.

== Story ==
This series follows the adventures of Soren, a young barn owl, for the first six books, and follows Soren's nephew Nyroc, later renamed Coryn, for Books 7 and 8. Books 9-11 are prequels to the other books, telling the story of Hoole, the first king of the Great Ga'Hoole Tree. Books 12-15 continue the main storyline, through the reign of King Coryn. Book 16 is another prequel, this one telling the story of Ezylryb, Soren's mentor.

=== The Capture ===
Soren, a young Barn Owl (Tyto alba), lives in a nest in a hollow of a fir tree with his parents Noctus and Marella and siblings Kludd and Eglantine, in the forest kingdom of Tyto. Soren, unable to fly, falls out of the nest to the forest floor, and is abducted by a patrol of owls from the St. Aegolius Academy for Orphaned Owls, or St. Aggie's, which is led by General Skench, a Great Horned Owl, and her lieutenant Spoorn, a Western Screech Owl. Soren and other snatched owlets are enslaved into tasks such as sorting eggs and pellets, for reasons they do not understand. Owls at St. Aggie's are "moon-blinked", a brainwashing technique caused by sleeping and walking under the full moon, endlessly repeating their true names to forget them and lose any sense of self and will.

Soren befriends Gylfie, a young Elf Owl from the desert kingdom of Kuneer. Together, under the guise of being moon-blinked, they plot both to learn the true purpose behind St. Aggie's and escape. Gylfie suspects that a Spotted Owl named Hortense is not moon-blinked. They befriend her, learning she is sneaking out stolen eggs to return them to their parents with the help of two eagles, Zan and Streak. Hortense is discovered by the Academy owls as she delivers another egg to Zan, and is thrown from a cliff to her apparent death during the ensuing fight. Soren and Gylfie also meet a partly moon-blinked Boreal Owl named Grimble, and plan to escape as he teaches them how to fly. On the night of the pair's planned escape, they are discovered by Skench; she kills Grimble, but Soren and Gylfie manage to escape by taking flight for the first time.

After escaping, Soren and Gylfie meet Twilight, an orphan Great Gray Owl who learned his survival instincts from the "Orphan School of Tough Learning", and go looking for their families. While Soren is unable to find his parents and siblings, he reunites with his former nest-maid Mrs. Plithiver, a western blind snake. She regretfully informs Soren that Kludd had shoved him out of the nest and later did the same thing to Eglantine, forcing Mrs. Plithiver to flee. The group travel to Kuneer and unsuccessfully search for Gylfie's family, but encounter Digger, a Burrowing Owl, who also lost his family to the St. Aggie's marauders. The group are attacked by Jatt and Jutt, two Long-eared Owls who serve as high-ranking officers for the Academy, but manage to kill them with help from Zan and Streak. The newly-formed band decide to search for a legendary order of warrior owls called the Guardians of Ga'Hoole, to warn them about the Academy.

=== The Journey ===
Soren, Gylfie, Twilight and Digger, accompanied by Mrs. Plithiver, fly in search of the Great Ga'Hoole Tree, where the Guardians are said to live. They face numerous obstacles along their way, including an attack by crows, a fight with a bobcat, and an encounter with a family of puffins. After a lengthy search, the Band finally find their way to the Great Tree, which is located on an island in the middle of the Sea of Hoolemere, and are welcomed by the Guardians. As they settle into life at the Great Tree, the Band begin training as Guardians in selected classes called chaws, where young owls study in fields such as star navigation, tracking, search-and-rescue, colliering, and weather research. They also meet other young owls, such as Otulissa, a Spotted Owl, and Primrose, a Northern Pygmy Owl.

After completing their basic training, the Band are selected for their official chaws. Soren is assigned to the colliering and weather chaws, along with Otulissa; Martin, a Northern Saw-whet Owl; and Ruby, a Short-eared Owl. The chaw's ryb, or teacher, is Ezylryb, an elderly Whiskered Screech Owl, who proves to be an excellent mentor despite his intimidating appearance and withdrawn demeanor. Soren is initially hesitant, but develops his skills under Ezylryb's guidance, participating in expeditions such as flying through a gale and harvesting burning coals from a forest fire.

Shortly after Soren's first colliering mission, the Guardians must go into action when hundreds of owlets are found abandoned in the middle of an uninhabited forest, an incident that becomes known as "the Great Downing". All of the owlets belong to the Barn Owl family; in addition, they all seem to be extremely confused, constantly babbling about the "purity of Tytos". Among the owlets, Twilight and Digger are shocked to discover Eglantine, Soren's lost sister. She is brought back to the Great Tree and eventually recovers from her ordeal, but she and the other rescued owlets have no memory of what had happened to them. In addition, Ezylryb mysteriously disappears in the aftermath of the incident, but Soren vows to find him.

=== The Rescue ===
Some time after the Great Downing, Ezylryb is still missing, so Soren and his friends decide to investigate. After narrowly surviving a flight through a hurricane during an outing with the weather chaw, Soren dreams of the scrooms, or spirits, of his parents, who warn him to "beware Metal Beak". Bubo, the blacksmith of the Great Tree, informs Soren that Metal Beak is actually a mysterious owl, believed to be one of the most evil owls in the world. After learning that a rogue Snowy Owl blacksmith in the forest of Silverveil may have more information, Soren and the Band sneak away during a week-long festival to talk to the Smith. They discover that the Smith is actually the sister of the Great Tree's famous singer, Madame Plonk, and that she is also on friendly terms with Ezylryb and his nest-maid Octavia, a Kielian snake from the Northern Kingdoms. The band return to the Great Tree with their new information, although they are caught and punished for sneaking away without permission.

After investigating Ezylryb's living quarters and discovering a secret chamber, Soren and Gylfie are interrupted by Octavia, who reveals that Ezylryb was once known as Lyze of Kiel, a famous warrior from the Northern Kingdoms. Shortly thereafter, Eglantine begins to regain her lost memories, and recalls being imprisoned in an abandoned stone castle by Metal Beak and his followers, a mysterious group of Barn Owls called the Pure Ones. Soren, Gylfie, Twilight, Digger, Eglantine, and Otulissa, dubbed the "Chaw of Chaws", sneak away from the Great Tree again to search for the castle, hopeful that Ezylryb may be there.

After locating the castle, the Chaw discover that the Pure Ones possess knowledge of "Flecks", magnetic iron particles which can confuse and disable owls, which were also prized by the leadership of St. Aggie's. Using Otulissa's knowledge on the subject, they eventually find Ezylryb trapped inside a "Devil's Triangle", a disorienting magnetic field created by placing three bags of Flecks in a triangular formation, and manage to free him by burning all three bags to destroy the Flecks. However, it is revealed that Metal Beak and a group of Pure Ones had trapped Ezylryb, and a fight ensues. Martin and Ruby arrive in time to reinforce their friends, and the Chaw manage to fight off their attackers using burning branches. In the process, however, Soren is horrified when Metal Beak reveals himself to be Kludd, whose "metal beak" is a mask and artificial beak made of Mu metal, a soft alloy that negates the effect of Flecks. During their fight, Soren inadvertently covers Kludd's mask in burning embers; this causes it to partially melt, burning Kludd's face and forcing him to retreat. Ezylryb and the Chaw return safely to the Great Tree and are met with a joyous reception. As daylight sets in, Ezylryb writes a poem reflecting on the impending war with the Pure Ones.

=== The Siege ===
Immediately after his fight with Soren, a badly-burned Kludd crashes into a pond near the hollow of Simon, a Brown Fish Owl and a pilgrim from the Glauxian Brothers' Retreat in the Northern Kingdoms. Simon nurses Kludd back to health, but Kludd then murders him. As he leaves to regroup with the Pure Ones, he is observed by a nearly-invisible Spotted Owl named Mist.

At the Great Tree, Dewlap, the Burrowing Owl Ga'Hoolology ryb, declares the topic of Higher Magnetics and the book Fleckasia and Other Disorders of the Gizzard "spronk" (forbidden knowledge) despite its importance in understanding Flecks and their effect on owls. Soon after, the Chaw of Chaws are given a secret mission to infiltrate St. Aggie's Academy, as the Guardians' leaders believe that the Pure Ones are obtaining their Fleck supply from the Academy's large stores. Ezylryb gives Otulissa the banned book, but Dewlap later finds her reading it and sentences her to a punishment. Otulissa initially complies, but eventually flies off to join the Chaw on their mission; frustrated, Dewlap flings the book into the sea. After reaching St. Aggie's under assumed identities, the Chaw are put through moon-blinking sessions, but each of them has memorized a part of the Ga'Hoolian legends in order to resist. Soon, they discover Barn Owls smuggling Flecks out of the library where the particles are stored, and using some of them to influence the Barn Owl eggs that the St. Aggie's patrols have been stealing. Otulissa gains the trust of St. Aggie's General Skench by giving her misinformation about Higher Magnetics, and learns that some of the Barn Owl infiltrators are actually double-agents for St. Aggie's.

Meanwhile, at the Pure Ones' castle, the Rogue Smith of Silverveil is hired to make a new mask for Kludd and battle claws for the Pure Ones' army, but after deducing that they are planning an attack on the Great Tree, she goes to tell Mist. At St. Aggie's, the Chaw plan to escape by inciting a fight between the workers and the Barn Owl spies. They all manage to escape in the resulting commotion, but Soren is wounded in the process and falls gravely ill. Fortunately, he is saved when Mist arrives with Zan, Streak, and a flying snake named Slynella, whose venom heals him. Mist reveals herself as Hortense, having survived her fall from the cliff, and warns the Chaw of the Pure Ones' impending attack. The Chaw returns to the Great Tree to alert the Guardians, who prepare for war.

The Pure Ones, led by Kludd and his mate Nyra, launch their attack on the Island of Hoole. After several clashes and a lengthy siege, Soren, his friends, and Ezylryb devise a plan to turn the tables by digging a tunnel from the Great Tree to the other side of the island, allowing the Guardians to attack the Pure Ones from behind in a pincer movement. This plan is a success; the siege is broken in a decisive battle, and the Pure Ones retreat from the island. During the battle, however, Strix Struma, Otulissa's mentor, is killed by Nyra, leaving Otulissa devastated, while it is revealed that Dewlap had betrayed the Guardians by leaking information to the Pure Ones during the siege. In the aftermath of the battle, Soren realizes that he possesses an ability known as starsight, which allows him to see glimpses of the future in his dreams.

=== The Shattering ===
Ginger, a Barn Owl and a former Pure One taken in by the Guardians after she was wounded in the Battle of the Siege, has become friends with Eglantine and Primrose, but she still displays some suspicious behavior (such as deliberately torturing a mouse), and seems to be driving a wedge between Eglantine and her other friends. Meanwhile, Eglantine begins having strange, vivid dreams of her mother, Marella, making a new nest in the region known as The Beaks. Despite having been informed by Soren of his previous encounter with their parents' spirits, Eglantine becomes convinced that her dreams are real, and that her mother must still be alive. Meanwhile, Soren and the Band discover a page from the lost Fleckasia book that Dewlap had confiscated from Otulissa and thrown into the sea. Soren returns the page to Otulissa, who uses it, with help from Ezylryb, to deduce that Fleck exposure can lead to a condition called "shattering", which can cause owls to become confused, lose their emotions, and even experience delusions.

Eglantine and Ginger eventually travel to The Beaks, where they find the nest from Eglantine's dreams, occupied by a female Barn Owl who Eglantine believes to be Marella; however, it is actually Nyra, Kludd's mate. Convinced that Nyra is Marella, Eglantine secretly begins making regular trips to The Beaks to visit her, and is even influenced into bringing her papers about Flecks from the Great Tree's library. One night, Primrose sees Eglantine leaving and follows her to The Beaks, but is captured by the Pure Ones. They force her to sleep in a nest full of Flecks, but she manages to avoid being shattered by using a piece of amber to remove the Flecks from her nest.

Back at the Great Tree, Digger has become suspicious of Eglantine's odd behavior, and discovers that Ginger has secretly been slipping Flecks into Eglantine's nest. He and Otulissa deduce that Eglantine has been shattered, and the Guardians launch a mission to find her and Primrose. Meanwhile, Eglantine finally breaks free of the shattering when she discovers that Nyra has captured Primrose, but she is also captured by Nyra, Ginger, and the Pure Ones. A forest fire breaks out, forcing the Pure Ones to abandon Nyra's nest in order to protect her and Kludd's first egg, referred to as "the Sacred Orb". Eglantine and Primrose steal the egg and flee into the fire, pursued by Nyra's forces. The Guardians pick up their trail and, despite being heavily outnumbered by the Pure Ones, Ezylryb devises an ingenious strategy to trick the enemy into thinking that the Guardians have far more soldiers at their disposal. During the resulting clash, Eglantine, still in her confused state, falls into a trance and comes dangerously close to being burned alive; she manages to recover and escapes, but is forced to drop the egg in the process, destroying it.

In the aftermath, the Guardians return to the Great Tree, but they soon receive bad news when word arrives that Kludd and the rest of the Pure Ones have invaded and conquered the canyonlands of St. Aggie's, giving them control over the Academy's vast supply of Flecks. As a result, the Chaw of Chaws are given a special mission by Ezylryb and the rest of the Guardians' parliament: to travel to the Northern Kingdoms, both to deliver the exiled Dewlap to the Retreat of the Glauxian Sisters, and to acquire more knowledge, weapons, and allies for the Guardians, in preparation for a final assault against the Pure Ones.

=== The Burning ===
After officially becoming Guardians, the Chaw of Chaws depart for the Northern Kingdoms, Ezylryb's hatching place, to seek help for their war against the Pure Ones. Gylfie and Otulissa deliver Dewlap to the Glauxian Sisters, and then travel to the Glauxian Brothers to research Flecks in their extensive library. In the process, Otulissa develops a crush on Cleve, a male Spotted Owl of royal descent who is studying medicine at the library, while Gylfie discovers that Ifghar, Ezylryb's traitorous younger brother, and his Kielian snake attendant Gragg, are also living at the Brothers' retreat to receive care in their old age. After learning of the Guardians' mission, Gragg and Ifghar begin plotting to exact revenge on Ezylryb by informing the Pure Ones of their plans, and recruit a band of pirate owls to help them.

Meanwhile, Martin and Ruby seek out a veteran Kielian snake named Hoke to help in recruiting troops to aid the Guardians, while Soren, Eglantine, Twilight and Digger go in search of another of Ezylryb's old allies, a Snowy Owl named Moss. With help from Svall, a polar bear, they are successful, but Moss cannot promise aid from the Northern Kingdoms' Kielian League until their leaders can discuss the proposal. After receiving training and a supply of ice weapons from Moss and his allies, the Chaw prepare to return to the Great Tree, but they are attacked by the pirates and Gylfie is abducted. The others are forced to return home without her, while Gylfie is questioned by Ifghar and Gragg. She refuses to give them any information, and is eventually rescued by Twilla, a Short-eared Owl who had tended to Ifghar at the Glauxian Brothers' retreat. Instead of returning to the Great Tree, Gylfie decides that she must continue trying to convince the Kielian League's leaders to support the Guardians.

Having returned to the Great Tree, the rest of the Chaw join the other Guardians in preparing for their invasion of the canyonlands, where the Pure Ones have established their new headquarters in the former stronghold of St. Aggie's Academy. Soren aids in covert missions to neutralize the Pure Ones' new defenses of Fleck emplacements, in preparation for the attack. Finally, the Guardians launch their invasion, sparking a massive battle in the canyonlands. There are many casualties on both sides, but the Guardians gain the upper hand when Gylfie arrives with the Frost Beak and Glauxspeed Divisions from the Northern Kingdoms, having been successful in her attempts to convince them to join the fight. As the battle rages, Soren finally comes face-to-face with Kludd once more, and they engage in a final duel. Kludd wounds Gylfie, but Twilight intervenes and kills Kludd. The Pure Ones are defeated, and the Guardians and their allies are victorious.

In the aftermath of the battle, Nyra watches over her and Kludd's second egg, which hatches into their son, Nyroc. Meanwhile, the Guardians and the Northern Kingdom forces return to the Great Tree, where they celebrate their victory and mourn their losses. Soren and Eglantine are briefly reunited with the spirits of their parents, whose unfinished business has been fulfilled with Kludd's death, allowing them to pass on and find peace.

=== The Hatchling ===
After Kludd's death, a vengeful Nyra raises their only hatchling, Nyroc, to take his place, and teaches him to hate Soren, blaming him for Kludd's death. Despite being Kludd's heir, Nyroc has only one real friend among the Pure Ones: a Greater Sooty Owl named Dustytuft, although Nyroc calls him by his old name, Phillip. During their Final Ceremony for Kludd, which entails the burning of his bones, the rogue smith Gwyndor, a Masked Owl, discovers that Nyroc has firesight, the ability to see visions in fire. Gwyndor later visits the Rogue Smith of Silverveil to discuss the situation, and is horrified when she warns him that Nyroc's initiation into the Pure Ones, the "Special" or "Tupsi" ceremony, will require Nyroc to commit a cold-blooded murder, just as Kludd attempted to do when he tried to kill Soren as an owlet. Hoping to help Nyroc escape from the Pure Ones, Gwyndor returns and shows him another fire, in which Nyroc sees visions of the past atrocities committed by Kludd and Nyra, as well as the revelation that Twilight, not Soren, killed Kludd. Horrified, Nyroc tries to flee the canyonlands with Phillip, but they are tracked down and captured by the Pure Ones with help from Doc Finebeak, a Snowy Owl tracker. Nyra reveals that Phillip is Nyroc's intended victim for his Special ceremony, but when Nyroc refuses to kill Phillip, Nyra slashes Nyroc's face and kills Phillip herself. Horrified, Nyroc declares his hatred of her and flees.

Now forced to survive on his own, Nyroc finds himself haunted by Kludd's vengeful spirit. He also faces an additional challenge, as he now has a scar on his face similar to Nyra's, causing other owls to fear him on sight. Living in hiding, he listens to the conversations of other owl families, and learns some of the Ga'Hoolian legends, particularly those concerning the first colliers and the mysterious Ember of Hoole, a special coal imbued with powerful magic, which he had also seen in Gwyndor's fire. Eventually, he meets a strange rabbit with a similar ability to his own, who can see visions in spiderwebs. The rabbit advises Nyroc to go to the place that his firesight visions showed him: Beyond the Beyond, the land where the first colliers came from. After flying through a forest fire and seeing visions of Otulissa, Nyroc encounters the spirit of Strix Struma, who advises him that Otulissa has a role to play in his future. At the Great Tree, Otulissa is also visited by Strix Struma's spirit, who convinces her to travel to Beyond the Beyond as well. Meanwhile, Nyroc is confronted by Kludd's spirit again, but defies him, vowing never to return to the Pure Ones and asserting his own free will.

=== The Outcast ===
Having freed himself from Kludd's haunting spirit, Nyroc casts off his old name and life. He is then found by two flying snakes, Slynella and Stingyll, and is brought to Mist, who teaches him to read, write, and tells him stories of Hoole and the wolves of the Beyond. He eventually renames himself Coryn, a reversal of Nyroc, and finally decides to travel to Beyond the Beyond. On his way there, he hears that a Burrowing Owl family has had their egg stolen by the Pure Ones, and decides to help. Disguising himself as his mother's scroom, he successfully rescues the egg and returns it to its family; in return, they name the hatchling after him, and the hatchling’s older sister Kalo befriends him. Coryn stays with their family for a few days, before continuing his journey.

After arriving in Beyond the Beyond, Coryn spends some time observing the clans of dire wolves who live there. After one wolf hunt by the MacDuncan clan, he feeds on a moose carcass alongside a grizzly bear, and allows the wolves to join only if they allow the deformed "gnaw wolf" Hamish, the lowest-ranking member of their clan, to eat first. Coryn and Hamish become friends after this incident, and Coryn learns from Hamish about the Sacred Watch, a special order of wolves that guards the Beyond's volcanoes, where the Ember of Hoole is hidden. Only deformed wolves can do so, and are promised rebirth into a new life in exchange for their life of service.

Elsewhere, rumors spread of Nyra's death, which she uses to her advantage. She murders the Rogue Smith of Silverveil to steal her identity, and uses the smith's art to obtain additional bargaining chips from a gullible magpie. She then flies to the Beyond to try to recruit dire wolves for her army, and strikes a deal with a jealous clan of wolves known as the MacHeaths who want the ember for themselves, maiming their own pups in the hope they will be chosen to join the Watch. However, one of the MacHeaths, a she-wolf named Gyllbane, is suspicious of Nyra and leaves the clan to warn Coryn. Meanwhile, Otulissa also flies to the Beyond, following the guidance of Strix Struma's spirit. She crosses paths with Gwyndor, and they both eventually find Coryn.

Hamish joins the Sacred Watch, while Otulissa teaches Coryn how to master the skill of colliering. Coryn uses his firesight to see his mother is near, and has more visions of the Ember of Hoole. With guidance from Strix Struma's spirit and from Gyllbane, he finally embraces his destiny and dives into one of the volcanoes to retrieve the Ember, proving himself to be the rightful heir to the Great Tree. Nyra attacks Coryn in an attempt to seize the Ember, but Hamish, Gyllbane, Doc Finebeak, Nyra's former lieutenant Uglamore, and many other owls and wolves rally to protect him. Nyra is nearly caught by a rabid wolf, which kills Uglamore, but she manages to escape. The crippled wolves of the Watch all receive their wish of new life, choosing to remain alive as wolves but with healed bodies.

After bidding farewell to Hamish and Gyllbane, Coryn flies with Otulissa and Gwyndor to the Great Tree, where he meets Soren and Eglantine. Otulissa bids farewell to Strix Struma's spirit, and Coryn is crowned as the new king of Ga'Hoole.

=== The First Collier ===
On his deathbed, Ezylryb tells Coryn and Soren to read three ancient books of legends that were hidden in his hollow. The first of them tells the story of Grank the First Collier, how he met the dire wolf Fengo, and how he found the Ember of Hoole.

One thousand years earlier, Grank, a Spotted Owl, is born in the Northern Kingdoms, or N'yrthghar, during a chaotic time of conflict and war. He is a close friend to the kingdom's young rulers, King H'rath and Queen Siv, who are also Spotted Owls. Grank possesses the ability of firesight, and eventually travels to Beyond the Beyond, where he befriends Fengo, the chieftain of the dire wolves, who also has firesight and helps him to master his abilities. Over several years, Grank returns to the Beyond numerous times, and develops the skills that lead him to become the first collier. Eventually, he even manages to retrieve the Ember of Hoole from within one of the volcanoes. However, Grank's firesight is amplified dramatically by the Ember's power, and becomes so overwhelming that it effectively paralyzes him for some time.

Meanwhile, H'rath and Siv's kingdom is threatened by hagsfiends, monstrous owl/crow-like birds who have mastered evil magic. Lord Arrin, a traitorous owl who is allied with the hagsfiends, begins murdering H'rath's soldiers and prepares his own army to launch an invasion. Grank witnesses all of this through his firesight visions, but is locked in such a deep trance that he does not go to help until Fengo finally intervenes, breaking the trance and convincing him to return the Ember to the volcano. This clears Grank's mind, and he flies back to the N'yrthghar to help, but he is too late: H'rath has been killed in battle by Lord Arrin and one of his allies, the hagsfiend Penryck, while Siv flees with her and H'rath's only egg. Siv and Myrrthe, her faithful servant, seek shelter at the retreat of the Glauxian Sisters, but the owls there have been placed under a mind-controlling spell by hagsfiends, forcing the pair to flee. Grank arrives at the Sisters' retreat shortly thereafter, and breaks the spell by using an ice splinter to pierce the gizzard of their superior, thus purging them all of the hagsfiends' magic.

Grank reunites with Siv and Myrrthe in the hidden Ice Cliff Palace. Siv explains that Lord Arrin and the hagsfiends desire her egg, which Grank senses possesses powerful magic. To keep it safe, she gives the egg to Grank, who promises to care for her unborn son. Lord Arrin's hagsfiends arrive, and Siv draws them away while Grank escapes with the egg. He lands on a remote island, where he meets a young Great Horned Owl named Theo, who becomes his apprentice and the first blacksmith. Meanwhile, Siv and Myrrthe seek shelter with a polar bear named Svenka, but the hagsfiends eventually catch up to them and kill Myrrthe. While Siv is confronted by Lord Arrin and his hagsfiends, her egg hatches in the care of Grank and Theo, and her son Hoole, the first king of Ga'Hoole, is born.

In the present, Coryn comes to a dreadful realization, and admits to Soren that he believes Nyra may actually be a hagsfiend.

=== The Coming of Hoole ===
In the present, Gylfie, Twilight, Digger and Otulissa join Soren and Coryn in reading the legends. The second book of legends describes the hatching and the early life of Hoole.

Hoole grows up with Grank, Theo, and a young Pygmy Owl named Phineas, who become his closest friends and teachers, and also befriends a Glauxian Brother named Berwyck, a Boreal Owl from the Brothers' nearby retreat. Elsewhere, Siv escapes from Lord Arrin's hagsfiends with help from Svenka, and goes into hiding under the guise of a gadfeather, or traveling singer. She forms a friendship with a Snowy Owl gadfeather known as the Snow Rose, and the pair travel to the Glauxian Brothers' retreat. After seeing the smoke from Grank and Theo's forge, Siv encounters Hoole for the first time, but conceals herself for his safety. Meanwhile, Lord Arrin and Penryck dispatch two of their lieutenants, a hagsfiend named Ygryk and her Great Horned Owl mate Pleek, to track down Siv and Hoole. Siv eventually reveals herself to Hoole, and he recognizes her as his mother, having already seen visions of her thanks to his firesight. Pleek and Ygryk arrive and a fight ensues, but Grank, Theo, Siv and the Snow Rose manage to chase the pair off, and Siv flees to help keep Hoole's true identity a secret. Grank decides to take Hoole, Theo and Phineas to Beyond the Beyond, where they will be out of Lord Arrin's reach. Pleek and Ygryk flee to the Ice Narrows, where they meet with the powerful hagsfiend Kreeth, who seeks a way to make hagsfiends immune to saltwater, as they have no oil in their feathers to protect them.

In the Beyond, Fengo clashes with Dunleavy MacHeath, a power-hungry wolf who desires the Ember's magic. Grank, Hoole, Theo and Phineas fly across the Southern Kingdoms' sea on their way to the Beyond, stopping briefly on an island, where Hoole's tears seem to trigger the magical emergence of a rapidly-growing seedling tree. The four arrive in the Beyond, where Grank reunites with Fengo and convinces him to teach Hoole the ways of the dire wolves to help expand his knowledge of the world. MacHeath turns against Fengo and leaves the Beyond, traveling north to inform Lord Arrin about Hoole. On his way there, however, he encounters Siv and Svenka, who deduce his plans, and Siv flies south to raise an army. As MacHeath makes his way back to the Beyond after meeting with Lord Arrin, he is ambushed and killed by Hordweard, his former mate, who has abandoned his pack and changes her name to Namara.

Siv arrives in the Beyond with her army, and reunites with Hoole and Grank. Namara also returns with MacHeath's body, and Siv's followers and the wolves face off against Lord Arrin's arriving troops. As the battle rages, Hoole experiences a vision of the Ember and dives into one of the volcanoes to retrieve it. He is hailed as the rightful new king of the N'yrthghar, but Siv has been mortally wounded in the battle, and dies with Hoole and Grank by her side. In the aftermath, Hoole bids farewell to Fengo and Namara, before leading his friends and followers back to the island in the southern sea. When they arrive, they discover that the magical seedling has now grown into an enormous tree, and Grank dubs it "Ga'Hoole".

In the present, Otulissa deduces that Theo was the author of the second legend. Coryn theorizes that a "tear" in the fabric of the owl universe initially allowed magic to exist in their world, and fears that the Ember's return may allow the hagsfiends' evil magic to return as well.

=== To Be a King ===
In the present, Soren, Coryn, and the band move on to the third and final legend, which tells the story of Hoole's early days as king.

Hoole and his allies arrive at the Great Ga'Hoole Tree, where Hoole forms his new parliament of advisors, and begins to establish the foundations for the order of the Guardians. Meanwhile, Kreeth offers to provide Pleek and Ygryk with a chick of their own, by imbuing a Great Horned Owl egg with a powerful spell that should transform it into an owl-hagsfiend hybrid. Instead, however, the female chick, which Kreeth names Lutta, becomes a shapeshifter, able to transform into any owl species as well as a hagsfiend or a crow. Unable to care for Lutta, Pleek and Ygryk eventually choose to leave her in the care of Kreeth, who teaches Lutta to control her transformations and plans to use her to begin a new dynasty of dark magic.

As Hoole begins planning a campaign to retake the N'yrthghar, he sends Theo north on a scouting mission. Theo meets with Svenka to inform her of Siv's death, and later meets with her mate Svarr, who informs him that Lord Arrin's forces have splintered into a number of warring factions. After reuniting with his own family, Theo is shocked to learn that his younger brother Shadyk now leads one of those factions as a dangerously-unstable tyrant, and has seized H'rath and Siv's old Ice Palace from Lord Arrin. Meanwhile, Hoole, Phineas, and the Snow Rose embark on a scouting mission across the Southern Kingdoms, disguised as gadfeathers, in search of any hagsfiends who might be lurking there. After encountering a lone hagsfiend, which Hoole kills, they find evidence of a larger group in the desert of Kuneer. Using his firesight, Hoole realizes that dire wolves may be able to break through the hagsfiends' dark magic; he sends Phineas and the Snow Rose back to the Great Tree, and recruits Namara to help him carry out a new plan. He returns to Kuneer with a large pack of wolves, led by Namara and Fengo, and they successfully track down a flock of hagsfiends. In the ensuing battle, all of the hagsfiends are killed, but Fengo is mortally wounded and dies with Hoole by his side. The wolves then return to the Beyond, and Hoole returns to the Great Tree.

After spying on Theo during his journey north, Kreeth devises a plan to infiltrate the Great Tree and steal the Ember. She uses her magic to help Lutta transform into the exact likeness of a young female Spotted Owl named Emerilla, whose mother Strix Strumajen serves as a member of Hoole's parliament. As the real Emerilla has gone missing after a battle in the N'yrthghar, Lutta is able to use her identity to infiltrate the Great Tree, but she becomes conflicted after developing genuine feelings for Hoole. Meanwhile, Theo has already found the real Emerilla, who has been working undercover as one of Shadyk's servants in the Ice Palace while spying on the other factions. When Shadyk eventually tries to have Theo killed, Emerilla helps him to escape, and informs him that Lord Arrin has managed to unify all the other warring factions and is preparing to retake the palace, which is slowly melting due to the absence of a true king.

With the Guardians' preparations in place, Hoole launches his invasion plan, and his forces fly north to the Ice Palace, where they are joined by an army of wolves led by Namara. Lutta attempts to sneak back and steal the Ember once the Great Tree is left deserted, but discovers that Hoole has taken it with him. The battle begins, with many casualties on both sides; as it rages, Hoole reunites with Theo, and Strix Strumajen sees the real Emerilla. As Kreeth and Lutta observe the fighting, Lutta refuses to kill Hoole, but Kreeth subdues her and enters the battle, using her own immensely-powerful magic to disable Hoole's army. Hoole is unable to overpower her, but the wolves join him; their combined effort is enough to break through Kreeth's magic, and she is brought down and killed. Lord Arrin's army is defeated, and Hoole's forces take the Ice Palace. Hoole meets the real Emerilla, and they are confronted by Lutta, but Strix Strumajen intervenes and mortally wounds her, although Lutta confesses her love for Hoole before she dies. Hoole takes his place on his father's throne, and uses the Ember's power to restore the palace.

The battle is followed by a long period of peace. Hoole and Emerilla eventually become mates and have children, and live happily together for many years. Finally, an aging Hoole decides that he must take the Ember back to Beyond the Beyond and return it to the volcanoes, as no other living owls will be able to control its power once he dies. The pair fly to the Beyond, where Namara greets them and explains that the wolves will watch over the volcanoes until another worthy owl comes to retrieve the Ember again. As Hoole drops the Ember back into one of the volcanoes, he sees a vision of Coryn in the flames, and is satisfied that his true successor will someday appear.

In the present, Coryn realizes that he must one day return the Ember to the volcanoes as Hoole did, but Soren and the others remind him that his rule has only just begun and that he has much to do before that day comes. Twilight points out that hagsfiends have been extinct for centuries, so their dark magic should be gone; however, Coryn and Soren remain suspicious that Nyra may actually be a hagsfiend, and that their evil may survive in her.

=== The Golden Tree ===
Some time after Coryn's coronation, the Great Tree experiences an unusual change, with its leaves and berry vines remaining in their golden summer colors even as winter arrives. Coryn, meanwhile, is still distracted by his growing fear that Nyra may actually be a surviving descendant or reincarnation of the ancient hagsfiends. In an attempt to take Coryn's mind off of his worries, Soren convinces him to go on a journey through the Southern Kingdoms with the band, to take some time off from their usual duties and clear their heads. Before they leave, however, Coryn becomes concerned after some of the other Guardians seem to be obsessively focusing on the need to protect the Ember.

Soren, Coryn, and the band head off on their journey, during which the others tell Coryn the story of how they once met a Boreal Owl named Bess, Grimble's long-lost daughter, who lives in the hidden ruins of an ancient palace in the Shadow Forest. The following day, Coryn goes off on his own in search of the mystical rabbit that he encountered before, hoping that he might be able to learn more about Nyra's possible link to the hagsfiends. While he is unsuccessful, he does observe the magpie Trader Mags carrying out one of her auctions of exotic goods, and is shocked to discover that one of the antique items in her collection is an ancient book of dark magic that once belonged to the powerful hagsfiend Kreeth. He immediately alerts the others, but by the time they find Trader Mags again, she has already sold the book to another owl, who Coryn identifies as Stryker, Nyra's top lieutenant in the Pure Ones. Concerned that Nyra could potentially use the book to transform herself into a true hagsfiend, Coryn and the band begin hunting for her. Coryn finally reunites with the mystic rabbit, whose visions lead him to deduce that Nyra is still in the canyonlands, hiding out in the same cave where Twilight killed Kludd.

At the Great Tree, Otulissa and several others, including Madame Plonk and Bubo the blacksmith, become increasingly concerned as many of the Guardians grow more and more obsessed with the Ember, and even begin to worship it through bizarre rituals. This culminates in a prison hollow being built in the Tree, which escapes Otulissa's knowledge until she is arrested for hiding a precious teacup that Madame Plonk had asked her to hide from the Ember's worshippers. Devastated by this turn of events, Madame Plonk convinces Bubo to help her flee the Great Tree so she can seek out Coryn and the band. She flies across the sea and encounters Doc Finebeak, who offers to help her track them down.

After having a firesight vision of Gyllbane, Coryn leads the band to Beyond the Beyond, where they meet with Gyllbane, Hamish, and Gyllbane's crippled son Cody. The three dire wolves explain that their species once had their own version of hagsfiends, monstrous creatures known as vyrwolves, and that Gyllbane's former chieftain, Dunleavy MacHeath, has recently transformed into one, along with several other members of his clan, before leaving the Beyond and disappearing into a mysterious cave network. Digger identifies the cave in question as a legendary place among Burrowing Owls, known as the Tunnel of Despair. Gylfie flies deep into the tunnel, where she finds MacHeath and the other vyrwolves, and discovers that the other end of the tunnel is actually the cave where Kludd died.

Coryn, the band, and a wolf pack led by Gyllbane make their way to the canyonlands and launch an attack on the cave, where Nyra is plotting to use the Book of Kreeth to transform both herself and Coryn into hagsfiends. In the resulting battle, Nyra severely wounds Twilight, while Madame Plonk and Doc Finebeak arrive to join the fight. Madame Plonk manages to sing at an extremely high note known as mysticus (C-sharp in the eighth octave), which makes her voice so loud that it incapacitates the vyrwolves due to their sensitive hearing, allowing the normal wolves to defeat them. Nyra overpowers Coryn, but he defeats her by unconsciously channeling the power of the Ember, forcing her to flee. In the aftermath, all the vyrwolves have been killed, but Cody is also killed while protecting the Book of Kreeth. Soren and Doc Finebeak fly to Ambala and recruit the flying snakes Slynella and Stingyll, who manage to heal Twilight using their venom.

At the Great Tree, Primrose is also arrested on a false charge of blasphemy and imprisoned alongside Otulissa, after Coryn's channeling the Ember's power causes it to briefly dim while she is tending to it. Fortunately, the pair are saved when Coryn and the band finally return to the tree and, horrified at the actions of the Ember's worshippers, immediately tear down all of their gaudy decorations and dismantle the "elite order" that had been organized to guard the Ember. Coryn gives the Book of Kreeth to Otulissa to keep it safe, and hides the Ember in Bubo's forge, among a pile of other coals.

=== The River of Wind ===
In her research of some ancient documents from her palace home, Bess the Boreal Owl discovers that there is a sixth, hidden kingdom of owls, known as the Middle Kingdom or Jouzhenkyn, which is far away across a vast sea. She sends word of this discovery to Otulissa, who informs Coryn and the band of the news. After discussing the situation, they decide that the Chaw of Chaws, with the addition of Coryn and Mrs. Plithiver, will go to meet with Bess and then decide whether they should attempt a journey to the new kingdom. When they arrive at the Palace of Mists, Bess tells them what she knows about the Middle Kingdom, and they deduce that to travel there, they will need to follow a system of powerful, high-altitude winds, which should carry them all the way across the ocean. The Chaw then fly to the far coast of Beyond the Beyond, and, after navigating a deadly maze of violent winds, they find the high-altitude air currents known as the River of Wind, which serve as the pathway to the Middle Kingdom.

Meanwhile, Eglantine and Primrose are leading a training expedition with Soren's mate Pellimore for some of the Great Tree's young owls, including Soren and Pelli's three daughters: Bash, Blythe, and Bell. During the training flight, Bell wanders away from her navigation chawlet and is caught in a storm, which knocks her unconscious. While Eglantine and Primrose launch a search for Bell, Pelli returns to the tree and sends Doc Finebeak to join them. Meanwhile, Bell awakens to find herself in the care of a strange blue Snowy Owl named Orlando, who prefers to call himself "the Striga". It is revealed that he is from the Middle Kingdom, and has recently found his way across the River of Wind to the Southern Kingdoms. While he nurses her back to health, they are discovered and captured by Nyra and the Pure Ones, who have established a new underground headquarters in the desert of Kuneer. Eglantine and Primrose eventually pick up Bell's trail and find the Pure Ones' network of burrows. Listening in on their conversations, they discover that Nyra, having interrogated the Striga about his home and learned of the Chaw's departure across the sea, is planning to lead a small force to the Middle Kingdom in the hopes of assassinating Coryn and Soren. After meeting up with Doc Finebeak and sending him to rally the Guardians, the pair head for Bess's palace so they can follow the Chaw and warn them.

When the Chaw reach the Middle Kingdom, they are greeted by Tengshu, a blue Long-eared Owl sage who guards the end of the River of Wind. To their surprise, he already has extensive knowledge of the other five kingdoms, and explains that the owls of the Middle Kingdom obtained that information a thousand years earlier from Theo, the first blacksmith, who eventually left the Great Tree after discovering the River of Wind and made his way to the Middle Kingdom, where he spent the rest of his life. Tengshu escorts the Chaw to a place known as the Panqua Palace, where they observe an order of "dragon owls", large blue owls with immensely-long feathers that prevent them from flying, who are cared for by servants and spend their lives surrounded by beauty and luxury. Digger realizes that the dragon owls bear a distinct resemblance to hagsfiends, and secretly theorizes that Theo may have rendered the Middle Kingdom's ancient hagsfiends harmless by distracting them with an illusion of power and authority, until they eventually evolved into the dragon owls. They also learn that Orlando/Striga, revealed to be a dragon owl, had escaped from the palace after removing his elongated feathers.

In Kuneer, an Elf Owl healer named Cuffyn rescues Bell and the Striga from the Pure Ones after Nyra leaves with her assassin squad. They return to the Great Tree, and the Striga volunteers to lead the Guardians' forces to the Middle Kingdom. Meanwhile, the Chaw are summoned to the Mountain of Time to meet with Gup Theosang, a blue Burrowing Owl and the "H'ryth", or spiritual leader, of the Middle Kingdom. Twilight and Ruby receive some training in the Middle Kingdom's unique fighting style, known as Danyar. Tengshu returns to his post and encounters Eglantine and Primrose, who have found their way across the River of Wind ahead of Nyra's squad. After sending them to warn the others, Tengshu stays behind and engages the arriving Pure Ones, killing Nyra's lieutenant Stryker and several others. Eglantine and Primrose arrive at the H'ryth's Owlery just before Nyra's remaining forces, and the Chaw and the Danyar acolytes face off against the Pure Ones. Nyra's assassins briefly corner Coryn and Soren, but the Guardians' reinforcements arrive in time to turn the tide, and the Striga kills several of the assassins to save Coryn, although Nyra escapes. The H'ryth confronts the Striga, exposing his nature as a rogue dragon owl, but Coryn and the Guardians speak up on the Striga's behalf due to his act of saving Bell. The H'ryth reluctantly allows the Striga to return to the Great Tree with the Guardians, but warns that his destiny is still uncertain.

=== Exile ===
Some time after the battle in the Middle Kingdom, the Striga now resides at the Great Tree as a guest of Coryn and the Guardians. While some owls, like Coryn and Soren, feel indebted to him for the part he played in saving Bell and stopping Nyra's assassination attempt, others, like Otulissa and the rest of the Band, are perplexed by his odd behavior and his intense dislike of anything that can be considered an example of "vanity". During a private conversation with Otulissa, he explains that this attitude stems from his previous miserable life in the dragon owls' extravagant court. Otulissa, however, grows increasingly concerned about the Striga's behavior, especially after he privately convinces Coryn to send the Band out on a mission to help with one of her weather research projects. After they leave, Trader Mags visits the tree, and Otulissa is alarmed to learn from Mags that the Striga now also has followers in other parts of the Southern Kingdoms. She also discovers that books are disappearing from the Great Tree's library, and realizes that the Striga has been burning them.

Having realized that the Striga is manipulating Coryn and that he likely seeks to destroy all the books in the Great Tree, Otulissa secretly transports the most valuable ones to Bess's library, where they can be kept safe. Meanwhile, Doc Finebeak, who has also become suspicious of the Striga, discovers that he has founded a group of owls known as the Blue Brigade, who are bent on destroying anything that qualifies as "vanities". The Band have also witnessed one of these burning ceremonies; horrified, they travel to visit Mist, the eagles, and the flying snakes, who reveal that the Striga is using Coryn's authority to carry out the burnings. Mist leads them to a hidden sanctuary known as the Brad, where a group called the Greenowls have begun to safeguard books by memorizing them, taking inspiration from the remnants of an ancient document written by "Ray Brad", a long-dead member of an extinct species known to the owls simply as "the Others". However, a member of the Blue Brigade witnesses the Band's initial meeting with Mist, and the Striga uses this to spread rumors throughout the Southern Kingdoms, accusing them of consorting with spirits and dabbling in dark magic, as an excuse to banish them from the Great Tree. The Band are also horrified to discover that the Blue Brigade have even begun executing owls by burning them.

In the Middle Kingdom, Tengshu senses that the other kingdoms are in danger, so he travels across the River of Wind to warn the Guardians and meets up with the Band. At the Great Tree, Pelli deduces that the Striga has gained control over Coryn, and warns Otulissa and Bubo that he may try to seize the Ember. They quickly devise a plan, and Pelli takes the Ember to Bess's palace while Bubo gives Coryn another coal in its place. Pelli then learns about the Band's exile, and, after meeting with Mist and learning the truth, returns to the Great Tree to inform their allies. Tengshu trains the Greenowls in the martial art of Danyar, while Pelli alerts the other Guardians at the tree, and both groups begin preparing to fight back against the Striga's followers. Meanwhile, Cory (short for Coryn), the young Burrowing Owl whose egg Coryn once saved, flies to the Great Tree to plead with Coryn for help after his sister Kalo is persecuted by the Blue Brigade. He manages to spark Coryn back to reason, and Coryn's firesight helps him to realize that the Striga has been controlling him and that Kalo is in danger. He leaves the tree on his own to help her, and finds her being hunted by two members of the Blue Brigade. In the resulting fight, the mystic rabbit intervenes to help; both enemy owls are killed, but the rabbit is mortally wounded, and dies after advising Coryn and Kalo to join the Greenowls.

On the celebratory Balefire Night, the Greenowls fly to the Great Tree as the Guardians finish their preparations. During the celebrations, both groups launch a combined surprise attack on the Blue Brigade, and a battle ensues around and inside the tree. Bell joins the fighting to save Pelli, but is caught and held hostage by the Striga. However, Tengshu manages to knock the Striga away and free Bell, forcing the Striga and his remaining followers to flee the island. Otulissa is badly wounded in the fighting and loses an eye, but survives. During her recovery, she tells Kalo about her past friendship with Cleve, and Kalo convinces Coryn to send a message inviting him to the Great Tree. Cleve soon arrives, and he and Otulissa rekindle their feelings for each other. Meanwhile, Coryn, relieved to finally be free of the Striga's influence and of his own past, has a firesight vision of the Striga meeting with Nyra.

=== The War of the Ember ===
Dumpy, a puffin, witnesses a meeting between Nyra and the Striga in a cave in the Ice Narrows, as they form an alliance and Nyra plots to resurrect the race of hagsfiends. Unable to discuss the incident with other puffins and unsure of the Great Tree's location, Dumpy seeks out a polar bear named Sveep to share the information instead. She is concerned by the news, and convinces him to seek out the Guardians and inform them. After this, Sveep decides to visit her friend, the wolf Gyllbane - who has become the leader of the MacNamara wolf clan, and changed her name to Namara - and passes along the news to her as well. Enraged by the possible return of hagsfiends, Namara calls all the dire wolves of Beyond the Beyond to gather for a council. Gwyndor the rogue smith overhears her call, and decides to inform Coryn. Meanwhile, Bess's Palace of Mists is discovered by another Boreal Owl, who attacks her and tries to steal the Ember, but Bess kills him in self-defense and flies to the Great Tree to tell the Guardians about the incident.

Dumpy, Gwyndor and Bess all arrive at the Great Tree and provide their respective information to Coryn, the Band, and the other Guardians. Coryn and Soren organize a covert mission to remove the Ember from Bess's palace, and Coryn sends Tengshu to the Middle Kingdom to ask the H'ryth for permission to hide the Ember there. Meanwhile, Coryn assigns Otulissa and Cleve to go on a reconnaissance mission to the Northern Kingdoms. After returning to the Ice Narrows with Dumpy, they find feathers from another blue owl, as well as the remains of an unhatched egg, and are horrified to realize that the developing chick would have been a hagsfiend. They later find the aftermath of a battle, where a number of pirate owls and gadfeathers were killed by more blue owls. Meanwhile, in the Middle Kingdom, Taya, the head page of the Panqua Palace, discovers that a number of other dragon owls have escaped from the palace just as the Striga did. She informs the H'ryth, who passes the information on to Tengshu when he arrives, but refuses to allow the Ember into the Middle Kingdom; however, Tengshu does convince him to send a division of Danyar fighters to join the Guardians in the impending war. Elsewhere, the Striga and Nyra have established a hidden nest chamber in the ancient Ice Cliff Palace, where they intend to use eggs from the escaped dragon owls to birth a new generation of hagsfiends.

Coryn recruits Kalo, Cory, Gwyndor and Octavia to accompany him on a scouting mission to the Northern Kingdoms. Otulissa and Cleve arrive in the area of the Ice Cliff Palace and are ambushed by four dragon owls, but Cleve reveals that Tengshu has trained him in the techniques of Danyar and kills them. Meanwhile, the covert mission to transport the Ember is underway, but Soren and Gylfie are forced to intervene when Wensel, one of the owls participating in the mission, is attacked by three Pure Ones. Fortunately, two Great Gray Owls named Tavis and Cletus join the fight and help to chase them off. After noticing that Tavis and Cletus bear a striking resemblance to Twilight, Soren and Gylfie realize that they are actually his older brothers, and Twilight meets them for the first time when the rest of the Band meet up at the mission teams' destination. Elsewhere, various other allies come into play: Sveep recruits her mate Svarr and many other polar bears to join the fight; Coryn and his team visit Hoke and Moss, to request aid from the Northern Kingdoms' armies of owls and Kielian snakes; Dumpy manages to organize a fighting force of puffins; and Coryn orders Madame Plonk to recruit pirates and gadfeathers from the Northern Kingdoms, and sends Doc Finebeak to gather crows, gulls, and the Greenowls. He also sends a pack of dire wolves led by Namara to the Ice Cliff Palace to destroy the hagsfiend eggs, and travels to the Beyond himself, intending to use the Ember as bait to draw the Pure Ones' army there. He also meets with Hamish, and informs him that he intends to return the Ember to the volcanoes so that Nyra and the Striga can never obtain it.

The Guardians and their many allies all gather in the Beyond, where Coryn and Soren have devised a strategy to draw the Pure Ones in. A colossal battle ensues and rages for three nights, with many casualties on both sides. During a brief lull in the fighting caused by an eclipse, Coryn stealthily flies to the volcanoes with the Ember, and drops it back into the volcano where he once retrieved it. The wolves of the Sacred Watch return to their duties, with Hamish as their new leader. Namara arrives with her pack, and confirms that they were able to destroy all of the hagsfiend eggs, preventing their return. As the battle resumes and the Guardians gain the upper hand, Coryn uses a bonk coal to lure Nyra and the Striga, and they pursue him into the crater of one of the volcanoes. Soren joins Coryn, and the four owls engage in an intense duel. Nyra finally unleashes her true nature and attacks Coryn with the dark power of a hagsfiend, briefly overpowering him, but Soren stabs her in the heart with an ice splinter and she falls into the lava to her death. Soren and Coryn pursue the Striga out of the volcano, and Soren kills him, but it is revealed that the Striga had slashed through one of Coryn's wings during the fight, and the wing detaches from Coryn's body as he falls. Soren catches Coryn and carries him to safety, but Coryn is mortally wounded and dies peacefully with Soren, Otulissa, and the Chaw of Chaws by his side.

In the aftermath of the battle, the Pure Ones have been routed, and the Guardians and their allies are victorious. Soren, Gylfie, Twilight, Digger, Otulissa and Pelli watch as a new constellation, resembling Coryn, forms in the sky over the volcanoes. Despite Coryn's death, the wolves begin to send out a new chorus of celebration, which Namara reveals to be "the Song of the Monarch", as the Band and the Guardians proclaim Soren as the new king of Ga'Hoole.

=== The Rise of a Legend ===
This prequel tells the story of Ezylryb, formerly known as Lyze of Kiel. On the night when Soren and the Band first arrive at the Great Ga'Hoole Tree, Ezylryb's first encounter with Soren sparks him to reflect on his own youth.

At the time of Lyze's hatching, the Northern Kingdoms were torn by the ongoing century-long War of the Ice Claws between the Kielian League and the League of the Ice Talons, which had already killed Lyze's older brother Edvard and taken one of his mother's eyes. While still young, Lyze becomes jealous of a young snowy owl named Moss, due to him making milestones before Lyze, but attends a party in Moss's hollow and is shocked to discover he is shy. The two become fast friends and later meet Thora, who would later become the rogue smith of Silverveil, but who was then a runaway who could not stand her stepmother and wants to become the first female smith in the Northern Kingdoms. When Lyze is taken to observe the Kielian snakes, he befriends one named Hoke. Later, when observing the ice harvesters, he watches enemy owls engage them in battle. Lyze, Moss, and Thora become cadets, their early days punctuated by a traitorous cadet kidnapping Orf, a famous blacksmith, and their rescue of him. Lyze later meets a spirited female cadet named Lillium (Lil). Once allowed to go home, Lyze witnesses the hatching of his sister, Lysa, and instantly takes to her. However, she dies in a forest fire and their next sibling, Ifghar, does not captivate Lyze and often teases him. While at the academy, Lyze develops the idea of flying with Kielian snakes, using snow leopards on the ground, and using a special launcher to shoot burning metal spikes, though they abandon this last idea when they accidentally shoot a snow leopard. The war is hard-won, with Lil's death and Lyze breaking one of his talons, which leads to him biting it off, and one eye damaged so that it squints, leading to his distinctive appearance in the earlier books.

== Books in the series ==
=== Guardians of Ga'Hoole ===
1. The Capture (June 1, 2003)
2. The Journey (September 1, 2003)
3. The Rescue (January 1, 2004)
4. The Siege (May 1, 2004)
5. The Shattering (August 1, 2004)
6. The Burning (November 1, 2004)
7. The Hatchling (June 1, 2005)
8. The Outcast (September 1, 2005)
9. The First Collier (April 1, 2006)
10. The Coming of Hoole (July 1, 2006)
11. To Be a King (October 1, 2006)
12. The Golden Tree (March 1, 2007)
13. The River of Wind (July 1, 2007)
14. Exile (February 1, 2008)
15. The War of the Ember (November 1, 2008)
16. The Rise of a Legend (2013)

=== Legends of Hoole: The Story of the Ga'hoole tree ===
1. The First Collier (2006)
2. The Coming of Hoole (2006)
3. To Be a King (2006)

The legends are a part of the Band's experiences. A spin-off series of three books were planned, titled Legends of Ga’Hoole. However, the books were not published as a new spin-off series; instead the books were moved to the original Guardians of Ga'Hoole series, with the titles unchanged. They were numbered as books 9, 10, and 11 of the series. The advance copy editions show the subtitle on the covers, although the final editions were not released with this feature. A prologue and an epilogue were added to each book—in which Ezylryb instructs the Band to read the Legends hidden in a secret room before dying in his hollow—so as to tie the books together with the main series. The reading of the Legends later becomes important, as they play a crucial part in Soren's mentality in The Golden Tree (the first book released right after the three Legends, which resumes the adventures of Soren and the Band).

The three books—The First Collier, The Coming of Hoole, and To Be a King—are about the legendary young king Hoole the spotted owl, and his mentor (the first collier) Grank the older spotted owl (an old friend of Hoole's parents), along with the pacifist Theo the great horned owl, the first owl blacksmith. Grank was the first to find the Ember of Hoole, and King Hoole was the first to find the Great Ga'Hoole Tree. Hoole came under the protection of Grank because his mother, Queen Siv, was a close childhood friend of Grank's. Hoole also works to stop the tyranny of these demonic birds of prey called Hagsfiends (resembling a haggish-looking cross between owls and crows).

=== Guide books ===
Two guidebooks were released to give readers more insight into the world of Hoole. They are narrated by Otulissa.

1. A Guide Book to the Great Tree (2007) (written during events between The River of Wind and Exile)
2. Lost Tales of Ga'Hoole (2010) (written during events between The War of the Ember and Lone Wolf)

=== Wolves of the Beyond ===
Wolves of the Beyond is a spin-off series that tells the story of the "dire wolf" Faolan, his life and events in and around the territory known as the Beyond. Some returning characters from the original series include Gwynneth, the daughter of the renowned rogue smith Gwyndor (an Australian masked owl), as a main character, as well as Hamish, friend of King Coryn, clan leader Duncan MacDuncan of the dire wolves, and Soren. Legends and series history are frequently mentioned, including the stories of the ending battle of the first series, Guardians of Ga'hoole.

This sequel of Guardians of Ga'hoole tells the story of Faolan, a dire wolf abandoned at birth because of a deformed paw, in accordance with wolf law. He is saved from death by a female grizzly bear known as Thunderheart, who had just lost her most recent cub to cougars. She teaches him to use his misshapen footpaw so that it cannot be regarded as a weakness, but a unique strength. The young wolf is reared by Thunderheart for the first year of his life, until they become separated in an earthquake. While searching for his foster mother (or "second Milk Giver"), he meets Gywnneth for the first time, who convinces him that despite the hardships he will face, he must return to the other wolves and join a clan. Faolan is not well-received, and is often regarded with suspicion and fear because of his bearish ways and an odd marking on his deformed paw, a spiral, that further sets him apart from his fellows. He begins clan life in the lowliest possible position, a gnaw wolf, and is subjected to verbal and physical abuse, along with minimal shares of food. He befriends fellow gnaw wolves Edme and the Whistler, but his superior carving skills set him against Heep, a tailless gnaw wolf with a thirst for power. Faolan eventually earns a place as a Watch wolf of the Ring of Sacred Volcanos, where special dire wolves guard the Ember of Hoole (the sacred coal that determines the ruler of owls), along with Edme. Faolan eventually meets his wolf mother and discovers he has two sisters who were not abandoned, Mhairie and Dearlea. A year later, a neverending winter ushers in famine, and many wolves are driven mad by starvation, forsaking their clan history and sense of self under the thrall of a death cult that offers to speed them to the Cave of Souls (heaven). To further decimate the failing wolf population, both the Beyond and much of the Owl Kingdoms are mostly destroyed by a cataclysmic earthquake, flattening the Ring of Sacred Volcanoes, and ending the service of the Watch Wolves, whose natural deformities are miraculously healed. Guided by the presence of a spirit connected to his spiral mark, Faolan leads his friends Edme, the Whistler, two grizzly bear brother cubs named Toby and Burney, a mother wolf named Caila and her pup Abban, an abandoned wolf pup named Myrrglosch, former Watch wolf Banja and her new pup Maudie, and two mated bald eagles named Eelon and Zanouche (the latter is the great-great-great-granddaughter of Streak and Zan) out of the Beyond. The travelers are helped along their way by some common puffins, narwhals, and banded woolly bears across a massive ice bridge over the sea, to a land called the Distant Blue to begin a new life. At the same time, they are being pursued by an evil rout of rogue dire wolves (or outclanners) led by the evil yellow dire wolf Heep. Faolan and Edme also discover that they are reincarnations of two great dire wolves from ancient times, lovers Fengo and Stormfast. Faolan finds that he, alongside Fengo, is a reincarnation of a heroic grizzly bear named Eo and a female snowy owl gadfeather named Fionula, an old friend of Madame Brunwella Plonk. After a series of bloody battles with Heep, the travelers vanquish the outclanners and reach the Distant Blue, where the weather is fair and wildlife is plentiful. A passing horse welcomes Faolan, the "star wolf," back to the land.

1. Lone Wolf (2011)
2. Shadow Wolf (2011)
3. Watch Wolf (2012)
4. Frost Wolf (2012)
5. Spirit Wolf (2013)
6. Star Wolf (2014)

=== Horses of the Dawn ===
This series has a minor connection to Guardians of Ga'Hoole and Wolves of the Beyond as a standalone prequel and a historical fiction. Set during the Age of Discovery (specifically the early 1520s), it is a trilogy about a group of domestic horses who escape a human Spanish galleon leaving Cuba, led by a young filly named Estrella, who become feral. The herd must fight to stay alive in the new land of North America and seek out a new home of sweet-smelling grass that only Estrella herself can smell, where their ancestors evolutionarily originated, a valley somewhere along the western side of the Rocky Mountains called the Valley of the Dawn. Estrella is orphaned when her mother Perlina is devoured by a great white shark after being thrown off the ship (thrown overboard to make room for gold by the command of Hernán Cortés, who the horses call the Seeker) in the Caribbean Sea. Following the North Star, they travel far and wide up through the southern part of the continent - finding Chichen Itza in the Yucatan Peninsula, Tenochtitlan on Lake Texcoco in the Valley of Mexico (witnessing La Noche Triste), the Trans-Mexican Volcanic Belt pine-oak forests of migrating monarch butterflies, and even abandoned Puebloan cliff dwellings. They become known as the First Herd. They are later joined by an orphaned 12-year-old Native American human boy named Tijo (who learns how to speak to equines), some escaped mules and donkeys, a female bald eagle named Tenyak, a female mason bee named Grace, and a young male nameless coyote who later names himself Hope. Hope is the son of an evil coyote trickster, sometimes called First Angry, who often antagonizes the herd, but Hope is not sinister like his father. During their journey, they attempt to avoid and defeat a greedy and arrogant conquistador human going by the pseudonym El Miedo (his Christian name is Ignatio de Cristobal), a competitor of Cortes, briefly allied with an egotistical Andalusian stallion named Pegasus (Pego for short). In the second book, Star Rise, it is referenced that this series takes place long before Guardians of Ga'hoole for there is an oracular barn owl (a species the natives call the omo owl) featured that mentions to Tijo that things called Ga' and Hoole have not happened yet. (Guardians of Ga'hoole takes place in a post-apocalyptic world where humans are extinct, the geography changed, and certain new species evolved.) Also, just before the prologue of the same book, there is a quote from To Be a King. At the end of the third book, Wild Blood, when the crowd of animals finally reaches the legendary Valley of the Dawn, after being led the whole time by the spirits of an Eohippus, a human girl called First Girl, and Tijo's deceased wise stepmother Haru of the Burnt River Clan People, a connection is established to the ending of the sixth book in Wolves of the Beyond: Star Wolf, where Faolan, now back in his kind's (the dire wolves) original homeland, tentatively called the Distant Blue, with his team of fellow dire wolves and other animals, finds a narrow green valley inhabited by American bison and horses. One of these horses, a creamy white individual with a face scarred from a wildfire (making the face furless and "the skin crinkled up in ugly ridges"), is stationed on a promontory just ahead of Faolan, and using the memories of his past life—the legendary ancient dire wolf named Fengo who led the dire wolves on a similar quest—he discovers that this horse also has reincarnated memories of a past life of its own, as the equine recalls Fengo from the past, and acknowledges the ancient wolf is now reincarnated as Faolan.

1. The Escape (2014)
2. Star Rise (2015)
3. Wild Blood (2016)

=== Bears of the Ice ===
This series is set during a time in the main series of Guardians of Ga'Hoole. Set in a faraway northern Arctic land north of the Northern Owl Kingdoms called the Nunquivik, a mother polar bear named Svenna is forced to leave her two cubs, temporarily named First and Second before they get proper names, to take their place in a twisted cult of polar bears, led by one called the Grand Patek, worshipping a mighty constructed clock (put together by owls and a few sophisticated bears), known as the Ice Clock, upon a tall glacier, thus they are obsessed with time in a more humanlike sense. This great-sized clock was originally only meant to help predict the second happening of a past glacial-melting event called the Great Melting. With the great mechanism no longer being treated as a tool but now as an idol, this cult abducts cubs and forces them to work inside the giant clock's gears, turning it until they either die or lose one body part without dying - these enslaved cubs are referred to by the cultists as Tick Tocks. Escaping the rude and secretly cannibalistic Taaka, their first cousin once removed (she is their mother's first cousin, who even Svenna barely knows), First and Second (both born with special psychic powers) journey to find their long-lost father Svern, later joined by their second cousins Third and Froya. At the same time, the Grand Patek (the leader of the clock-worshipping bears) devises a master plan to even enslave the lands beyond the Nunquivik, even the Northern Owl Kingdoms. Svenna and Svern were both originally born and raised in the Northern Owl Kingdoms and thus know how to read and write. At one point in the first book it is revealed that Svenna knows the deceased Lyze of Kiel, or Ezylryb, and wonders what has happened back in the Owl Kingdoms since his death. It is also revealed that Svarr and Svenka, a clever polar bear from the time of Hoole (featured in The Coming of Hoole and To Be a King) who knew how to eavesdrop on others by listening through smee holes (natural steam vents), were Stellan and Jytte's ancestors.

1. The Quest of the Cubs (2018)
2. The Den of Forever Frost (2018)
3. The Keepers of the Keys (2019)

== Movie adaptation ==
A 3D computer-animated film adaptation of the book was released by Warner Bros. in 2010. Zack Snyder directed the film as an animation debut with Jim Sturgess, Geoffrey Rush, Emily Barclay, Helen Mirren, Ryan Kwanten, Anthony LaPaglia, and David Wenham voicing the characters.
