= Gronk (disambiguation) =

Gronk usually refers to Rob Gronkowski (born 1989), a former professional football player.

Gronk may also refer to:

== People ==
- Jordan Staal (born 1988), National Hockey League player
- Gronk (artist) (born 1957), Glugio Nicandro

== Characters ==
=== Comics ===
- Gronk, a minion of Maelstrom (comics) in Marvel Comics
- Gronk, a webcomic by Katie Cook
- The Gronk, a supporting character in the 2000 AD series Strontium Dog
- A dinosaur character in the comic series B.C.

=== Television ===
- A character on The Hilarious House of Frightenstein
- A character on It's About Time
- A character on The Ghost Busters

=== Video games ===
- A character in Hyperball Racing
- Lt. Gronk, in Sly Cooper

== Other uses ==
- British Rail Class 08, a diesel locomotive nicknamed GRONK
- GrOnk, a Canadian concrete poetry magazine active from 1967 to 1988
- "The Gronk", a track on the album Light On by Tom Harrell

== See also ==
- Grok (disambiguation)
