= Grunk =

Grunk or GRUNK may refer to:

- GRUNK, the government-in-exile of Cambodia (1970–1976)
- Grunk, a fictional character in the Krummerne TV series

== See also ==
- Grank (disambiguation)
- Gronk (disambiguation)
