= Grank =

Grank or GRANK may refer to:

- GRANK, a ranking of rarity of species
- Grank (Guardians of Ga'Hoole), a fictional character

== See also ==
- Grunk (disambiguation)
