= Kludd =

Kludd can refer to:

- A chaplain in the Ku Klux Klan
- A character from the Guardians of Ga'Hoole fantasy novel series by Kathryn Lasky
