= Grok (disambiguation) =

Grok is a word coined by Robert Heinlein meaning "to know intimately".

Grok may also refer to:

== Computing ==
- Grok (chatbot), an AI chatbot created by xAI
- Grok (JPEG 2000), a graphics library
- Grok (web framework), an open-source web framework based on Zope Toolkit technology
- Project Grok, later known as Google Kythe, a source code indexer
- Grok, a programming language created by Ric Holt
- Grokking (machine learning), a sudden transition of a model from memorization to generalization

== Other uses ==
- Grok Magazine, an Australian student magazine
- Grok Ventures, a company owned by Australian entrepreneur Mike Cannon-Brookes
- Grok Academy, an Australian educational technology company

== See also ==
- Groklaw, a defunct website
- OpenGrok, a source code search and cross reference engine
- Grock (1880–1959), Swiss clown and musician
- Grook, a form of short aphoristic poem
- The Groke, a fictional character from the Moomins
- Groq, an AI technology company
