= Google Kythe =

Originally known as Project Grok

- Developer: Google
- Stable release: none yet (as of February 2015)
- Written in: C++, Go, Java, JavaScript, Shell, Clojure
- Operating system: Debian
- Type: Indexer and cross-referencer
- License: Apache License 2.0
- Website: kythe.io

Google Kythe is a source code indexer and cross-referencer for code comprehension which describes itself as a "pluggable, (mostly) language-agnostic ecosystem for building tools that work with code".

== Overview ==
The core of Google Kythe is in defining language-agnostic protocols and data formats for representing, accessing and querying source code information as data. Kythe relies on an instrumented build system and compilers that produce indexing information, semantic information and metadata in Kythe specified format. This information obtained from running an instrumented build is stored in a language-agnostic graph structure. Finally, this graph structure can be queried to answer questions about the code base.

Google Kythe is an open-source project being developed by Google. It is licensed under an Apache licence 2.0.

== Grok ==
Google Kythe originates from an internal project called Grok.

Grok had been proposed by Steve Yegge in 2008. Yegge observed that software projects routinely use more than 3 programming languages, yet development tools tend to be language specific and don't handle multiple programming languages well. Adding support for a language to an IDE is hard and the ad hoc analysis tools in IDEs tend to be inferior to real parsers and compilers.

Some parts of Grok were publicly released even before Google Kythe was announced. In 2010, Google released a Python static analyzer which has been developed as part of Grok.

In 2012, C++, Java, Python, JS and "2 internal languages" were supported by Grok. There was a browser client with support for querying the database and visually navigating through the source code. There was an Emacs client.

Chromium Code Search Browser uses Grok index to provide quick links to definition for every symbol in the source code.

== See also ==
- Clang
- Language Server Protocol
- LXR Cross Referencer
- OpenGrok
