= List of Guardians of Ga'Hoole characters =

This is a list of Guardians of Ga'Hoole characters.

== Characters from the main storyline ==
=== The Guardians of Ga'hoole ===
==== The Band/Chaw of Chaws ====
- Soren: the main protagonist. He is a male barn owl. Soren was born in the Kingdom of Tyto, where he lived with his family. He is snatched by patrols from St. Aegolius Academy for Orphaned Owls after Kludd pushes him from the nest. He later escapes with his friend Gylfie and they meet Twilight and Digger before journeying to the Great Ga'Hoole Tree. On their way to the tree, Soren is reunited with Mrs. Horace Plithiver, his family's nest maid snake. Soren becomes a Guardian of Ga'Hoole, leader of The Band, leader of the Chaw of Chaws, a member of the Great Ga'Hoole Tree, the ryb of the weather interpretation, and colliering chaw after Ezylryb dies. He is the mate of Pellimore and the father of Bell, Blythe, and Bash. Soren has starsight, which allows him to view glimpses of the future through his dreams. At the end of The War of the Ember he becomes king of the Great Tree after the death of his nephew, Coryn. Voiced by Jim Sturgess in the film.
- Gylfie: a female elf owl who is Soren's best friend and part of "The Band". Gylfie was hatched in a cactus in the Desert of Kuneer and is snatched by patrols from St. Aegolius after trying to fly before her wings had completely fledged. She escapes with Soren, and after befriending Twilight and Digger, arrives at the Great Ga'hoole Tree. She becomes the navigation ryb. Voiced by Emily Barclay in the film.
- Twilight: a male great gray owl. He was orphaned only moments after hatching, and his only memory of the time is the fact that he hatched at twilight, hence the name. Twilight brags about what he calls “The Orphan School Of Tough Learning”, where he was taught survival by a bald eagle. In The Guide Book to the Great Tree, Twilight is revealed to be the son of a famous poet, Skye, and was named Cassius when he was hatched. He was snatched by St. Aggie's but escaped when he bit one of his captor's talons off. He is part of "The Band". Soren and Gylfie meet him after escaping from St. Aegolius. He claims that he taught himself everything about surviving and was abandoned within hours of hatching. He deals the final blow to Kludd in the Battle of the Burning. In The War of the Ember, it is revealed that he has two brothers, Tavis and Cletus, that he had never met. He is now a Guardian of Ga'Hoole and works in the search-and-rescue chaw. Voiced by Anthony LaPaglia in the film.
- Digger: a tracking burrowing owl who is part of "The Band". He was born in the Desert of Kuneer and separated from his parents when owls (Jatt and Jutt) from St. Aegolius attacked his family and ate his brother. He is a Guardian of Ga'Hoole and works in the tracking chaw. Despite being an owl, he is better at digging than flying, hence his name. It is revealed in The Shattering that he has a huge crush on Sylvana. Voiced by David Wenham in the film.
- Primrose: a female northern pygmy owl. Eglantine's best friend. A member of the search-and-rescue-chaw.
- Pellimore: a female barn owl nicknamed "Pelli". She is Soren's mate and the mother of Bell, Blythe, and Sebastiana. She is introduced in The Outcast. She is rescued by Soren from a forest fire, and the duo bond over their love of reading before becoming mates. She is also the ryb of the Search and Rescue chaw. She is almost killed in the battle during Exile but is saved by her daughter, Bell. At the end of The War of the Ember, Pelli becomes the queen of the Great Tree when Soren becomes its king following Coryn's death.
- Otulissa: a female spotted owl. She is the Ga'Hoolology ryb at the Great Tree, chief ryb, a member of the Chaw of Chaws, and a superb collier and weather interpreter. Since Strix Emerilla, her ancestor, is the mate of Hoole, she is a direct descendant of Hoole. She lost an eye in battle and now wears a bandana over it. Mate of Cleve and mother to 4 yet-to-hatch chicks. Voiced by Abbie Cornish in the film as a short-eared owl rather than a spotted owl.
- Martin: a male northern saw-whet owl. He is a member of the Chaw of Chaws; a Guardian at the Great Ga'Hoole Tree and a member of the colliering and weather interpretation chaw.
- Ruby: a female short-eared owl. She is in the colliering and weather interpretation chaw.
- Coryn/Nyroc: a male barn owl. He is Kludd and Nyra's chick, and is the first to not perform the Special Ceremony (Tupsi) as a Pure One. Nyra kills his best friend Phillip. He is considered to be one of the greatest monarchs since Hoole and also has firesight. He dies from blood loss when The Striga cuts off his wing and becomes a constellation in the sky. He is the nephew of Soren.

==== Owls and other creatures of the Great Tree ====
- Boron: a male snowy owl. He is the former king of Ga'Hoole, and died when Coryn came to the Great Tree. Voiced by Richard Roxburgh in the film.
- Barran: a female snowy owl. She is the former queen of Ga'Hoole, and died when Coryn came to the Great Tree. She was the ryb of the search-and-rescue chaw and was Boron's mate. Voiced by Deborra-Lee Furness in the film.
- Ezylryb/Lyze of Kiel: (deceased) a male whiskered screech-owl who was the mentor at the Great Ga'Hoole Tree. He is originally known as Lyze of Kiel when he was a warrior of the Kielian League in the Northern Kingdoms, and fought in the Battle of the Ice Claws. He was the ryb of the weather interpretation and colliering, and head librarian before he died of old age. Ezylryb mentors Soren and tells him that he should be his ward. He dies when Coryn comes to the Great Tree. Voiced by Geoffrey Rush in the film and by Robin Atkin Downes in the video game.
- Madame Plonk: a female snowy owl who is a singer in the Great Tree. She is a descendant of The Snow Rose.
- Eglantine: a young, female barn owl who is Soren and Kludd's younger sister. She is captured by the Pure Ones and Kludd and rescued in the Great Downing. She is a member of the search and rescue chaw. Voiced by Adrienne DeFaria in the film.
- Kalo: A burrowing owl who is Coryn's childhood friend. She is nearly burned as part of Striga's plans.
- Coryn (a.k.a. Cory): Kalo's younger brother, named for Coryn after he rescued him as an egg. He helps the original Coryn recover from his trance caused by the striga in Exile.
- Elvan/Elvanryb: A great gray owl who was the ryb of the colliering chaw.
- Mrs. Plithiver: a female blind snake who was formerly the nest maid for Soren's family, and is now a member of the harp guild at the Great Tree. Voiced by Miriam Margolyes in the film as a snake with eyes.
- Octavia: Female Kielian snake who was the nest maid for many years to Ezylryb and Madame Plonk. She is blinded in the War of the Ice Claws and adapts the senses of a true blind snake.
- Audrey: a female nest-maid snake who used to be the nest maid for Otulissa's family. She makes owlipoppen (fake owlet dolls) in The Burning.
- Doc Finebeak: A male snowy owl who is a freelance tracker formerly employed by the Pure Ones.
- Bubo: A male great horned owl who is the blacksmith at the Great Tree. Voiced by Bill Hunter in the film.
- Strix Struma: a female spotted owl. She was the ryb of the Navigation chaw before she is killed by Nyra in The Siege. She is a descendant of Strix Strumajen. Voiced by Sacha Horler in the film.
- Sylvana: a young female burrowing owl, ryb of the tracking chaw.
- Dewlap: a female burrowing owl and ryb of the Ga'Hoology chaw before Otulissa. Dewlap betrayed the Great Tree during The Siege. She is manipulated into helping the Pure Ones, who use her intense devotion to the Great Tree's health to convince her to help them. After her betrayal, she becomes a broken owl and is later taken to the Glauxian Sisters Retreat.
- Matron: a female short-eared owl who the head caretaker of wounded owlets at the Great Tree.
- Poot: A male boreal owl who is the first captain of the weather interpretation chaw, and becomes the leader when Ezylryb is captured.
- Trader Mags: a female common magpie that comes around annually to sell her wares.
- Silver: a male lesser sooty owl who is a member of the weather interpretation chaw and is rescued from the Great Downing.
- Nut Beam: a male Australian masked owl who is a member of the weather interpretation chaw and is rescued from the Great Downing.
- Fritha: a female Eurasian pygmy owl who is a student in the Great Tree and apprentice of Otulissa. She later reveals she is a kraal – a pirate owl of the Northern Kingdoms.
- Blythe: a female barn owl who is the eldest daughter of Soren and Pellimore.
- Sebastiana/Bash: a female barn owl who is the second daughter of Soren and Pellimore.
- Bell: a female barn owl who is Soren and Pellimore's youngest daughter. She trusts the Striga after he rescues her.
- Elyan: a male great gray owl who is the chairman of the Great Tree under Coryn. He is sent to the Glauxian Sisters Retreat as punishment.
- Gemma: a female whiskered screech owl who is the chaplain of the Great Tree. She tricks Elyan and other owls who are enthraled with the Ember of Hoole into turning the Tree into a prison for owls who do not worship the ember. She deserts Elyan and escapes the Tree as to avoid punishment from Coryn when he arrives and finds out what she has done. She is later declared a dangerous outlaw in the Southern Kingdoms.

=== The Pure Ones ===
- The Old High Tyto: the first Pure One's leader. In the books, he is only mentioned, having already been killed by Kludd and Nyra. In the film, he is the main antagonist and first "Metal Beak" (voiced by Joel Edgerton)—a greater sooty owl named Surtr (as revealed in the game only) who is also Ezylryb's arch-enemy: his face was scarred in the War of Ice Claws by the latter, and he wears a metal mask to hide the disfigurement. He is killed by Soren, who stabs him with a burning stick.
- Kludd/Metal Beak/High Tyto II: a male barn owl who is Soren and Eglantine's older brother. In the books, he is the only Metal Beak and the leader of the Pure Ones. Trained by Nyra, he becomes a Pure One guard. He falls into a forest fire when he tries to kill Soren, but is saved by a Fish Owl. He marries Nyra to become Metal Beak. In the books, he is killed by Twilight. Voiced by Ryan Kwanten in the movie.
- Nyra: a female barn owl who is Kludd's mate. She is killed when Soren throws an ice splinter into her chest and then being burned when the lava from the volcanoes pours into the cavern in The War of the Ember. Coryn believes her to be a hagsfiend in The First Collier. Voiced by Helen Mirren in the film as a much older owl and Surtr's mate.
- Wortmore: a male barn owl (identified in The Capture as a sooty owl) who is a Pure One lieutenant. He supposedly dies from flying snake venom in The Siege, but he reappears in The Golden Tree. Wortmore dies in the battle of the Middle Kingdom.
- Wort: a male barn owl who is a Pure One corporal. He dies in the battle of the Middle Kingdom.
- Uglamore (born Bartholomew IV): a male barn owl who is a Pure One sublieutenant. He deserts the Pure Ones and sacrifices himself for Coryn in The Outcast.
- Stryker: a male barn owl and Pure One lieutenant (later promoted to lieutenant major then commander) under Nyra, second in command later in the series; he is killed by Tengshu.
- Phillip "Dustytuft": a male greater sooty owl. He is a low caste owl of the Pure Ones who befriended Coryn at his hatching. He is killed by Nyra, who rips his heart out when Coryn refuses to do his Tupsi ceremony.
- Tarn: a male burrowing owl who is first in command under Nyra.
- Orlando/The Striga: a blue dragon owl from the Middle Kingdom who seeks a more meaningful life. He betrays Coryn and the Great Tree by joining Nyra. He is the leader of the Blue Brigade and is known for his brainwashing flattery. He takes control of the Great Tree, and has The Band exiled. Soren kills him by slicing his head off in the War of the Ember's last battle after the Striga cuts off Coryn's wing and kills him.
- Ginger: Nyra's comrade who gets wounded and is treated at the Tree, where she becomes a slipgizzle (spy) for them. She gets close to Eglantine, helps Nyra trick her, and rejoins the Pure Ones.
- Kylor: A turned slipgizzle who used to serve for the Guardians before being bought over to Nyra and the Striga's side. He feeds the Guardians falsified information.

==== Blue Brigade ====
- Field Marshal Cram: a male great horned owl who is first in command under the Striga. He is killed during the battle on Balefire Night by Gwyndor.

==== St. Aegolius Academy for Orphaned Owls ====
The St. Aegolius Academy for Orphaned Owls is an organization that portrays itself as an orphanage, but secretly seek to dominate the owl world through moon-blinking. They are defeated by the Pure Ones, who recruit, enslave or kill most of its members.

- Skench: a female great horned owl who is the ablah general of the academy. She is killed by Soren when she attacks the Guardians.
- Spoorn: a female western screech owl who is Skench's first lieutenant. She is killed by Martin with an ice splinter when she betrays them.
- Jatt and Jutt: Two long-eared owl cousins work at St. Aegolius and killed Digger’s family and ate his brother and abducted Soren and Kludd. Voiced by Leigh Whannell and Angus Sampson respectively in the film.
- Ork: a male long-eared owl who is part of the snatching patrol that attempt to steal Bess.
- "Auntie" Finny: a female snowy owl who is Soren's pit guardian at the academy. She is the owl that Soren fears the most when he infiltrates St. Aegolius. She pushes Hortense off a cliff after finding out that she was saving eggs from the Hatchery. Finny is slashed by Soren in the neck and bled to death.
- Hortense (a.k.a. Mist): A female spotted owl. She is originally from Ambala and is an adult despite her looks. She infiltrates St. Aegolius and saves eggs that the patrols had snatched. She is pushed off a cliff by Finny, but is saved by the eagles Streak and Zan.

=== Dire wolves ===
- Duncan MacDuncan: the leader of the MacDuncan clan of dire wolves in Beyond the Beyond and an ally of Coryn and the Chaw of Chaws. He later dies of old age in the Wolves of the Beyond series.
- Dunleavy B. MacHeath: the chieftain of the MacHeath clan of dire wolves in Beyond the Beyond and an ally of the Pure Ones. He recruits the members of the MacHeath clan to come with him to become vyrwolves and murders any who refuse.
- Gyllbane: a former member of the MacHeath clan. Her pup, Cody, was maimed and her mate was chased off both by Dunleavy B. Macheath.
- Cody: Gyllbane's son and a MacHeath (with MacDuncan ancestry). He is maimed by Dunleavy MacHeath in a desperate attempt to petition for a MacHeath to join the Sacred Watch and is the only survivor of Dunleavy's massacre. He dies when saving the Book of Kreeth in The Golden Tree.
- Hamish: a gnaw wolf In the MacDuncan clan. He is friends with Coryn, and becomes the new Fengo when Coryn returns the Ember of Hoole. In the Wolves of the Beyond series, Hamish has been revealed to have died sometime after the owl war.
- Brygdylla: a female dire wolf who appeared with Dunleavy MacHeath when he returned. She is later revealed to be a vyrwolf and slaughters MacHeaths who refused to become Vyrwolves themselves.

=== Other characters ===
- Grimble: a male boreal owl who is captured as an adult by the St. Aegolius patrols. He is killed by Skench as he helps Soren and Gylfie escape. Voiced by Hugo Weaving in the film, where he is killed by Nyra due to Skench not being in the film.
- Noctus: Soren, Kludd, and Eglantine’s father. Also voiced by Hugo Weaving in the film.
- Marrella: Soren, Kludd, and Eglantine’s mother. Voiced by Essie Davis in the film.
- The Rogue Smith of Silverveil: a female snowy owl who is Madame Plonk's sister. She eventually gave up making weapons and turned to art. She is killed by Nyra when she is shoved into a fire. Her name is revealed to be Thora Plonk in the Lost Tales of Ga'Hoole.
- Streak and Zan: Two bald eagles who rescue Hortense. Zan is mute. Streak is voiced by Fred Tatasciore in the video game.
- Cleve of Firthmore: A male spotted owl healer and prince from the royal hollow of Snarth in the Northern Kingdoms.
- Gwyndor: A male Australian masked owl who is a rogue smith. He realized that Nyroc has seen the Ember of Hoole and helped the future king reach his goal. He became a useful ally to Coryn (Nyroc). It is mentioned in the Wolves of the Beyond series that he died sometime after The War of the Ember was won by the Guardians.

=== Movie characters ===
- Echidna: the Echidna is a mystic who carries a walking stick and gives directions to the Great Tree to Soren and his friends. Voiced by Barry Otto.
- Allomere: a great gray owl who was a slipgizzle at the Great Tree for the Pure Ones. He is betrayed by Metal Beak and taken away by the latter's bat minions. Allomere manages to escape in secret but is killed by his former apprentice Shard after the latter finds out that he was responsible for his parents' deaths. Voiced by Sam Neill in the film and Andre Sogliuzzo in the video game.

== Characters in Wolves of the Beyond ==
- Faolan: the protagonist of the series who is a large, silver dire wolf who was born with a splayed paw that has a swirling symbol representing a gyre soul. As a gnaw wolf, he was a member of the Pack of the Eastern Scree in the MacDuncan clan. In Lone Wolf, he was born with a splayed paw, marking him as a malcadh, or a cursed one. He is left on a riverbank to die, but Thunderheart finds and adopts him as her own son. She names him Faolan, which translates into "gift of the river". With Gwynneth's advice, he returns to the clans as a gnaw wolf. In Shadow Wolf, he competes in a gaddergnaw, a competition between gnaw wolves to become members of the Sacred Watch. A malcadh pup is murdered, and Faolan is framed for the crime, but is vindicated after discovering another gnaw wolf, Heep, to be the culprit. He becomes part of the Watch with Edme MacHeath. Faolan has a unique ability to jump over high things.
- Edme: (a.k.a. Stormfast): a small, one-eyed dire wolf formerly of the MacHeath clan. When she was a pup, Dunbar MacHeath ripped out her eye with the purpose of placing her in the Watch. She renounces her ties to the clan and joins the watch as a free runner.
- Thunderheart: a female grizzly bear who adopted Faolan when he was abandoned on the river. She raises Faolan as if he were her own son, and is killed by a boulder rolling down a hill during an earthquake. In Watch Wolf, she joins Ursulana, the bear heaven, after Faolan reassures her spirit he is safe.
- Gwynneth: a female Australian masked owl who is a rogue smith. She is the daughter of the late Gwyndor and "niece" to the Rogue Smith of Silverveil.
- Shibaan: a female dire wolf and member of the MacDuncan Carreg Gaer. She is an Obea, a barren she-wolf responsible for taking away malcadh pups. She is killed in an earthquake when boulders crush her, upon which her spirit was able to care for the spirits of the pups she had abandoned for death in her lifetime.
- Sark of the Slough: a female dire wolf who was born into the MacNab clan. She was abandoned as a pup by her mother due to her ugliness being an embarrassment. She is injured by a boulder and dies on the shards of her memory jugs.
- Morag: Faolan's birth mother who was born into the MacDuncan clan, but joined the MacDonegal clan after her exile, and the MacNamara clan after she becomes blind.
- Brangwen: Morag's second mate. He and Morag join the MacNamara clan when she goes blind. Near the end of Frost Wolf, it is mentioned that he had gone to the Blood Watch.
- Heep: a tailless yellow gnaw wolf who is a member of the MacDuncan clan. He becomes Faolan's enemy after he frames him for the murder of a malcadh pup. He flees the clan and becomes the leader of a group of outclaners. Old Tooth kills him in front of Abban and leaves his body to feed the sharks and leopard seals.
- Angus MacAngus: the leader of the MacAnguses who is in charge of sky fire, or lightning, readings. He sees Faolan's paw print in the shadow of moon rot and mistakenly thinks it is a wolf with the foaming-mouth disease.
- Abban: the son of Heep and Aliac. After falling off the Ice Bridge — a bridge that the survivors use to get across the Frozen Sea — he sinks to the bottom. Old Tooth saves him from drowning, and they become friends. He speaks only in rhymes and songs until they reach their destination, and is also found to swim and speak the language of the fish.
- Caila "Aliac": Heep's mate and Abban's mother. She is saved by Faolan and Edme from the prophet but a fog comes and she disappears. She is rescued by Heep, who takes her as a mate. She leaves him after the earthquake and travels with the survivors to the Distant Blue.
- The Whistler MacDuncan: a gray wolf with a hole in his windpipe causing him to hiss and whistle when he talks. He chases Faolan thinking he has the foaming mouth disease, and is saved by him during the famine. He becomes a lieutenant of the Blood Watch.
- Mhairie: a tawny female wolf of the MacDuncan Carreg Gaer. She is Faolan and Dearlea's sister, and stands up for him when he is accused of murder.
- Dearlea: A once golden, now brown female wolf of the MacDuncan Carreg Gaer. Skreeleen. Daughter of Morag and Kinniard. She is Mhairie and Faolan's sister, and stands up for him when he is accused of murder.
- Toby "Ishodd": a young grizzly bear cub who is a great-grandson of the Bear of Bears. He is taken in by the MacHeaths to start the war between the bears and the wolves, and is saved by Faolan and Edme and returned to his mother. After his mother dies in the earthquake, Faolan and Edme adopt him.
- Burney: a young grizzly bear cub who is a great-grandson of the Bear of Bears. His mother dies in the earthquake, leaving him and his brother as orphans before Faolan and Edme adopt him.
- Liam MacDuncan/The Prophet: a son of Duncan MacDuncan and disgraced leader of the MacDuncans. He becomes the Prophet, and leads thousands of wolves to their deaths during the famine. He is killed by a boulder during the earthquake.

== Characters from Legends of Ga'Hoole ==
- Hoole: a male spotted owl who is the son of King H'rath and Queen Siv. After his father is murdered by Lord Arrin, Siv flees and takes Hoole's egg with her into hiding. She gives the egg to Grank to raise on a remote island in the middle of the Bitter Sea. Hoole grows up unaware of his royal lineage until Grank takes him to Beyond the Beyond, where he discovers who his mother was and retrieved the mysterious ember from one of the volcanoes of the Sacred Ring. After his mother's death, he leads a band of owls to the newly formed Great Ga'Hoole Tree and becomes the king. He defeats Arrin and his armies and brings peace to the N'rythghar. His primary goal is to rid the owl world of magic, which he considers to be a very dangerous and powerful force. At the end of his life he returns the ember to the same volcano he retrieved it from, but not before seeing a vision of a barn owl thousands of years in the future come and retrieve it once more. Hoole has the ability of firesight and is Emerilla's mate.
- H'rath: a male spotted owl who is the king of the N'rythghar, Siv's mate, and Hoole's father. He is killed by Lord Arrin during a siege on the Ice Palace.
- Siv: a female spotted owl who is the queen of the N'rythghar, H'rath's mate, and Hoole's mother. She goes into hiding after the death of her husband and raises an army to fight against Lord Arrin and his hagsfiends in the Beyond. She is killed by hagsfiends and dies in the wings of her son.
- Grank: a male spotted owl. He is the first owl to find the Ember of Hoole. Grank raises Hoole on an island in the Bitter Sea. He dies of old age, making Hoole promise to return the ember to Dunmore Volcano at the end of his life.
- Theo: a male great horned owl who is born to an abusive father who wanted him to become a soldier. He leaves the family hollow to become a Glauxian Brother. He meets Grank on the island in the middle of the Bitter Sea and trains under him. He is the first blacksmith and created many inventions. He is a gizzard resister and would only fight when there is no other option available. Theo later travels to the Middle Kingdom and writes the Theo Papers, an extensive philosophical document.
- Shadyk: a male great horned owl. Theo's younger brother. Shadyk was a mad usurper of King H'rath's throne in the Ice Palace, causing the palace to rot.
- The Snow Rose: a female snowy owl whose descendants include the Plonk family.
- Emerilla: A female spotted owl who becomes Hoole's mate.
- Lutta: a changeling created by Kreeth from a normal hatchling. She is killed by Strix Strumajen for impersonating Emerilla.
- Lord Arrin: a male spotted owl who is part hagsfiend; he kills H'rath and Siv.
- Dunleavy MacHeath: a dire wolf and Fengo's enemy. He is known to cruelly abuse his mates and pups, even killing some in a mad rage. Tried to gain an alliance with Lord Arrin to rule the S'yrthghar. Killed by Namara MacNamara on Broken Talon Point. Not to be confused with Dunleavy B. MacHeath.
- Ragwyn: one of Dunleavy MacHeath's mates. She suffers from an injury delivered by her mate in a violent rage, and is used as a messenger between MacHeath and Hordweard, Ragwyn delivers Dunleavy's best gnaw bone to Hordweard as a peace offering. After her mate's demise, Ragwyn joins Namara to form the first of the MacNamaras', taking her and Dunleavy's pups with her.

== Characters from Horses of the Dawn ==
- Estrella: a buckskin domestic horse filly with a special star-like marking on her forehead. She is the leader of the Dawn Herd.
- Hold On: an elderly dapple gray stallion. He goes blind in a canyon fire.
- Perlina: Estrella's mother who has the Eye of the Past—the ability to see the times when horses were free. She is eaten by sharks after being thrown off a ship.
- Pegasus (Pego): arrogant Arabian horse of prestigious lineage who betrays the Dawn Herd many times. He dies after taking a bullet to save Estrella.
- Tijo: an orphaned twelve-year-old Native American human boy raised in the Burnt River Clan by Haru who learns to speak to equines.
- Haru: a Native American in Tijo's tribe who takes care of Tijo until she dies from being poisoned by a rival healer, takes the form of many animals after death in order to help Tijo and the Dawn Herd.
- The Seeker (Hernán Cortés): the man who came to the New World with the members of the Dawn Herd and threw the original four horses of the herd into the ocean in order to lighten the boat.
- El Miedo (Ignatio de Cristobal): A powerful explorer who captures Pego, Estrella, and Tijo and forces them to work for him until Tijo and Estrella escape and Pego is killed.
- Coyote (First Angry): a coyote who often tricks the Dawn Herd and Pego.
- Hope: a young adult coyote who goes against his father, First Angry, and helps the Dawn Herd on their journey.

== Characters from Bears of the Ice ==
Under construction
