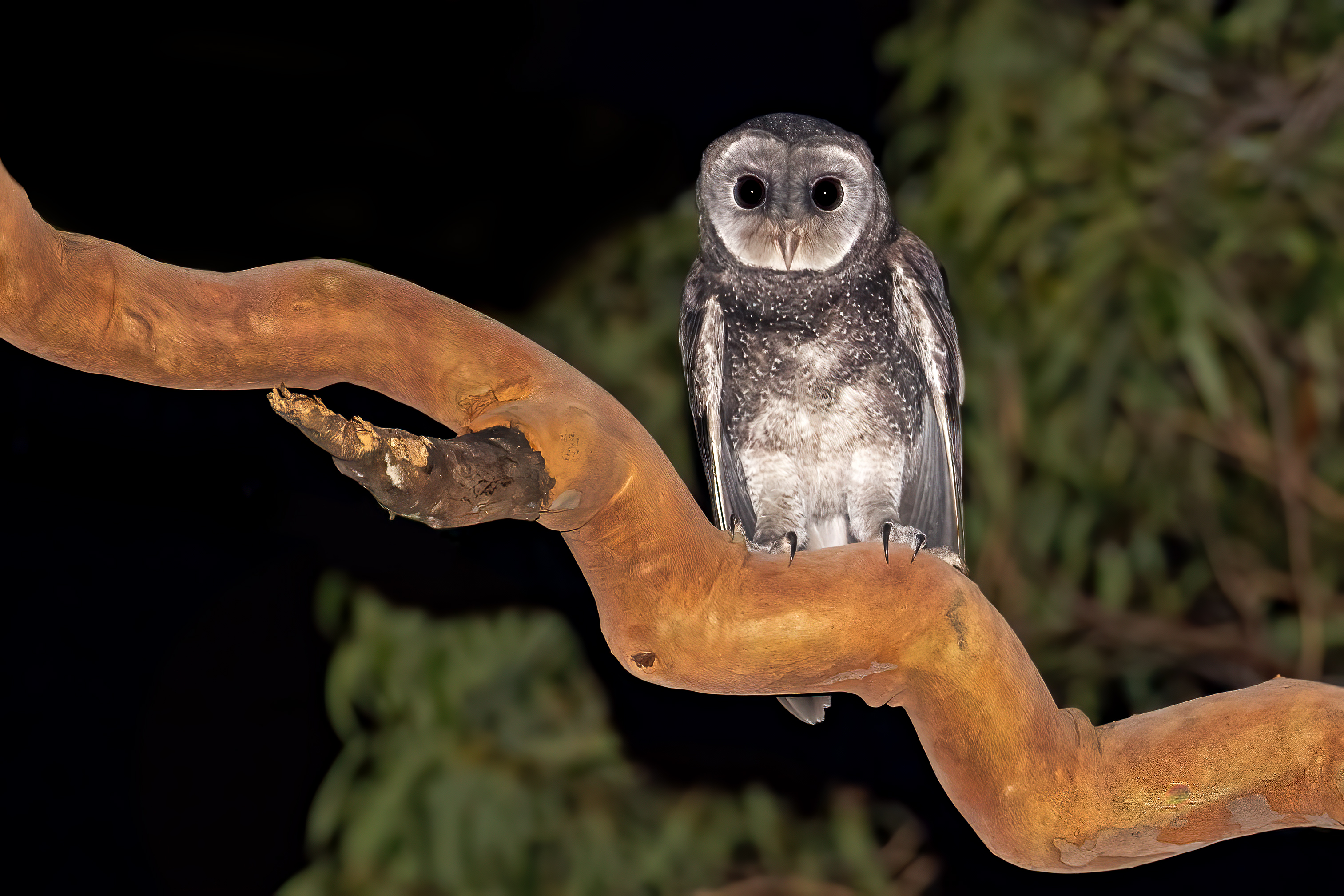

Conservation status
- Least Concern (IUCN 3.1)
- CITES Appendix II (CITES)

Scientific classification
- Kingdom: Animalia
- Phylum: Chordata
- Class: Aves
- Order: Strigiformes
- Family: Tytonidae
- Genus: Tyto
- Species: T. tenebricosa

Binomial name
- Tyto tenebricosa (Gould, 1845)

Subspecies
- T. tenebricosa arfaki T. tenebricosa tenebricosa
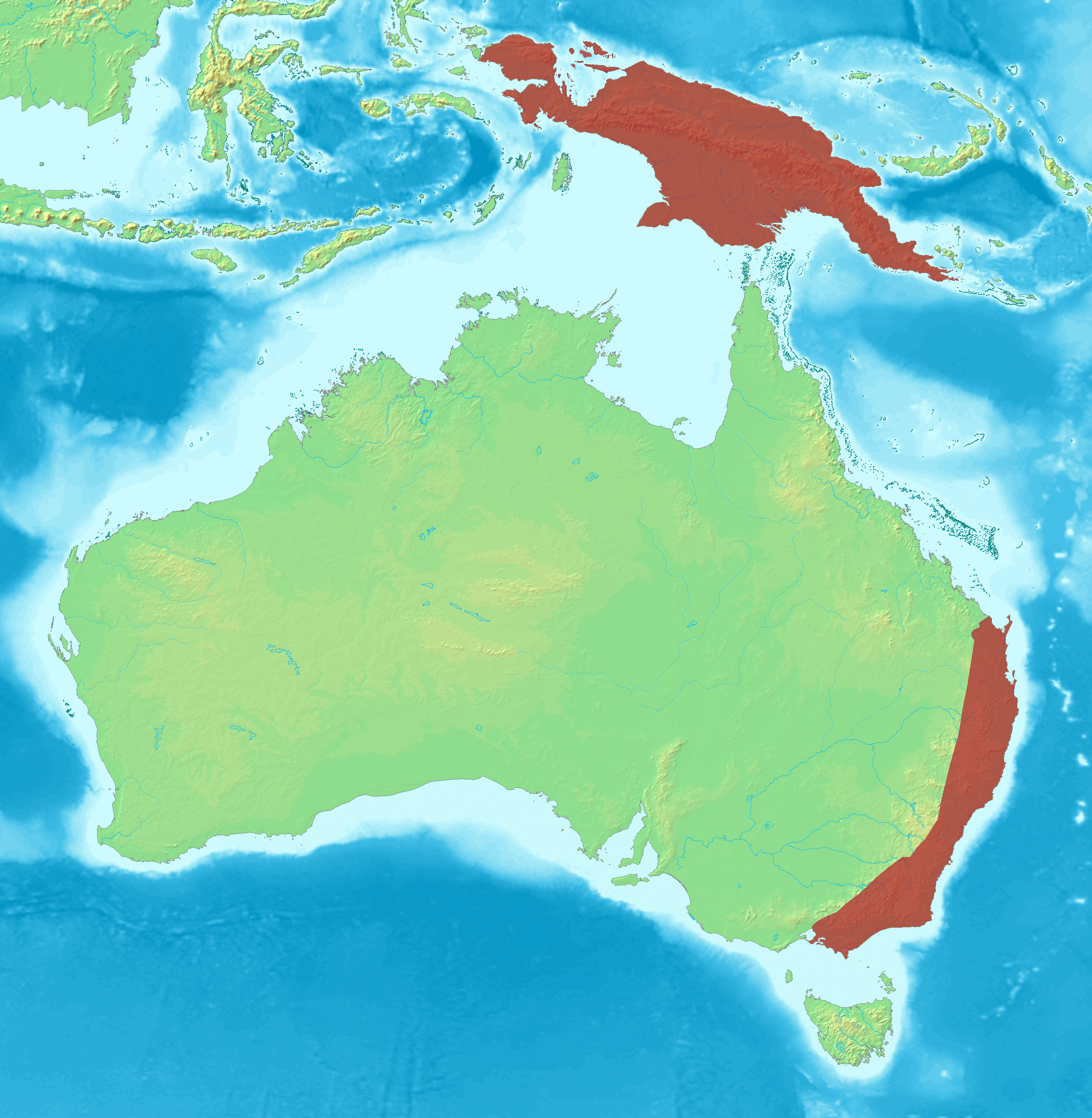
- The distribution of the greater sooty owl

Synonyms
- Strix tenebricosa Gould, 1845.

= Greater sooty owl =

Species of owl

The sooty owl or greater sooty owl (Tyto tenebricosa) is a medium to large owl found in south-eastern Australia, Montane rainforests of New Guinea and have been seen on Flinders Island in the Bass Strait. The lesser sooty owl (T. multipunctata), is sometimes considered to be conspecific with this species, in which case they are then together referred to as sooty owls. It is substantially smaller and occurs in the wet tropics region of North Queensland, Australia.

== Description ==
Greater sooty owls have a finely white spotted head with scattered white spots on the wings. The females are lighter colored than the males. They appear to be the heaviest of the living species in the barn owl family, however the Tasmanian subspecies of the Australian masked owl is larger still. The females' length is 41 to 50 cm (16 to 20 in) and weighs 750 to 1,200 g (1.65 to 2.65 lb). The smaller male has a length of 37 to 43 cm (15 to 17 in) and weighs 500 to 700 g (1.1 to 1.5 lb). The wing length is 30–40 cm. The large dark eyes are set in a round large facial disk. The facial disk is dark gray-silver or sooty black (changing with age) and has a heavy black edge. The upper part of the owl is black to dark gray and the under part is lighter. The tail is short and the legs are feathered. The feet and talons are large. Their call is a piercing shriek which can last up to two seconds.

== Habitat ==
Greater sooty owls are nocturnal and roost in large tree hollows, caves and in dense foliage during daylight hours. Rarely seen or heard, they can be found in areas with deep gullies in moist forests, where smooth-barked gum trees, tree ferns and wet forest under-storey are present. They may hunt in drier areas but usually roost and breed in the moister areas.

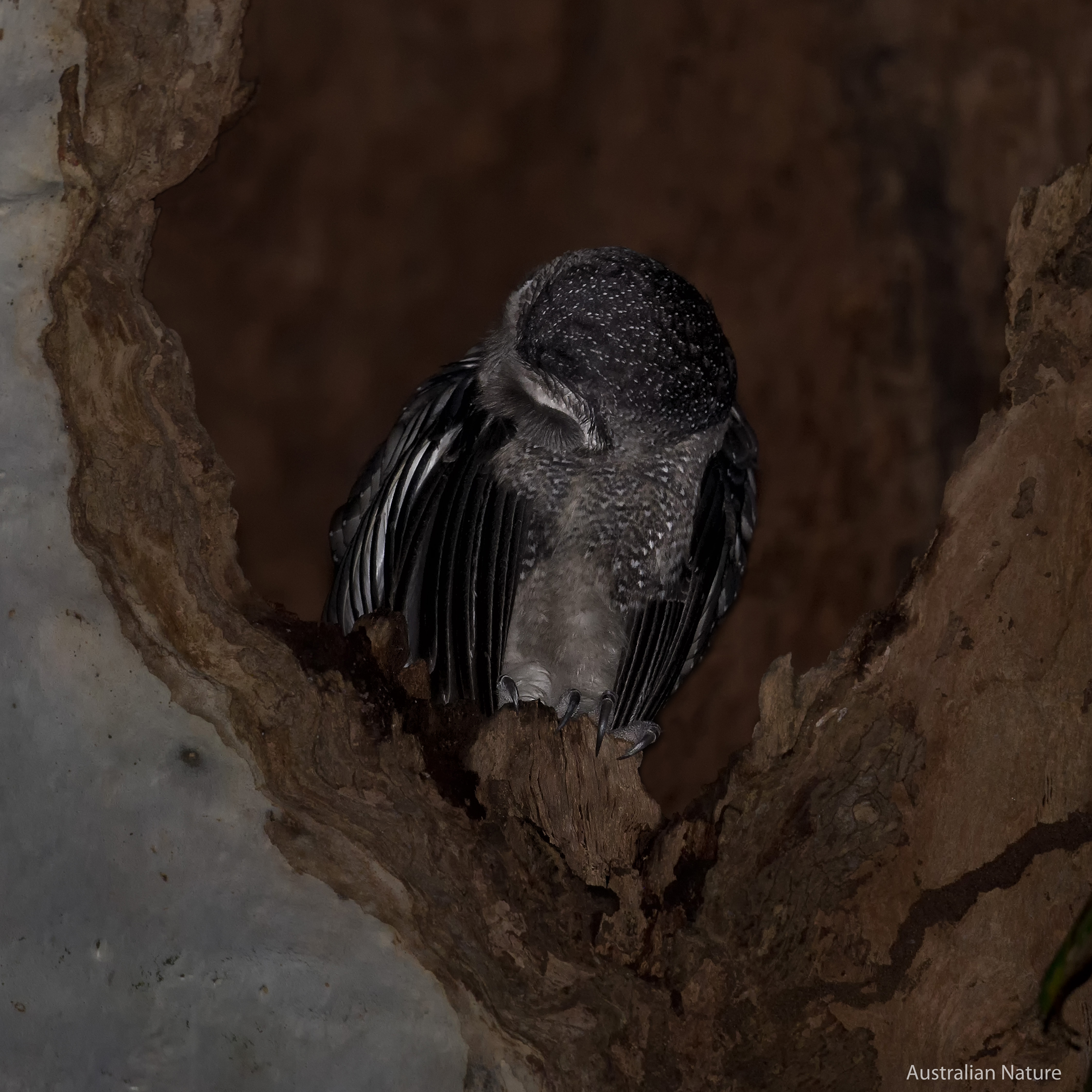
Greater sooty owl emerging from a tree cave at dusk

== Diet ==
Mammals, ranging from large arboreal marsupials such as the greater glider, through ringtail possums and sugar gliders, to bandicoots, rodents, and antechinus comprise the most common items in the greater sooty owl diet. They also occasionally take birds, bats, and insects.

Their dietary habits have changed since colonisation, possibly due to the reduction of terrestrial animal species, and they take more arboreal animals.

== Behaviour ==
Greater sooty owls are territorial and are thought to remain in the same area throughout their adult lives. Sooty owls have a distinctive range of calls including typical barn owl like rasps and screams, a distinctive "falling bomb" call and an insect like twitter used during close contact with other sooty owls.

== Reproduction ==
The nest is in a large hollow tree or a cave. The female roosts in the nest for several weeks before she lays one or two dull white eggs. Usually nesting commences from January through June but could occur at almost any time of the year depending on location and climatic conditions. The incubation time is 42 days. The male brings food to the female who rarely leaves the nest. The young are born with dull grey down and can fly in three months. The young remain dependent on the parents for an extended period after fledging. Their lifespan is unknown. They are territorial and sedentary throughout the year.

== Conservation status ==
=== International ===
Their status is not globally threatened.

=== Australia ===
Greater sooty owls are not listed as threatened on the Australian Environment Protection and Biodiversity Conservation Act 1999. However, their conservation status varies from state to state within Australia. For example:

- The sooty owl is listed as threatened on the Victorian Flora and Fauna Guarantee Act (1988). Under this Act, an Action Statement for the recovery and future management of this species has been prepared.
- On the 2007 advisory list of threatened vertebrate fauna in Victoria, the sooty owl is listed as vulnerable.
- On the New South Wales Threatened Species Conservation Act (1995), the sooty owl is scheduled as vulnerable.
