= Mycerinopsis roepstorffi =

Scientific classification
- Kingdom: Animalia
- Phylum: Arthropoda
- Class: Insecta
- Order: Coleoptera
- Suborder: Polyphaga
- Infraorder: Cucujiformia
- Family: Cerambycidae
- Genus: Mycerinopsis
- Species: M. roepstorffi

Binomial name
- Mycerinopsis roepstorffi (Breuning, 1964)

Synonyms
- Sybra roepstorffi Breuning, 1964

Species of beetle

Mycerinopsis roepstorffi is a species of beetle in the family Cerambycidae. It was described by Breuning in 1964. The species is named after the collector Frederik Adolph de Roepstorff who obtained specimens from the Andaman Islands.
