= Mycerinopsis tonkinea =

Scientific classification
- Kingdom: Animalia
- Phylum: Arthropoda
- Class: Insecta
- Order: Coleoptera
- Suborder: Polyphaga
- Infraorder: Cucujiformia
- Family: Cerambycidae
- Genus: Mycerinopsis
- Species: M. tonkinea

Binomial name
- Mycerinopsis tonkinea (Pic, 1926)

Species of beetle

Mycerinopsis tonkinea is a species of beetle in the family Cerambycidae. It was described by Maurice Pic in 1926.
