= Mycerinopsis =

Scientific classification
- Domain: Eukaryota
- Kingdom: Animalia
- Phylum: Arthropoda
- Class: Insecta
- Order: Coleoptera
- Suborder: Polyphaga
- Infraorder: Cucujiformia
- Family: Cerambycidae
- Subfamily: Lamiinae
- Tribe: Apomecynini
- Genus: Mycerinopsis; Thomson, 1864

Synonyms
- Zotale Pascoe, 1866

Genus of beetles

Mycerinopsis is a genus of beetles in the family Cerambycidae, containing the following species:

subgenus Mycerinopsis

- Mycerinopsis flavosignata Breuning, 1973
- Mycerinopsis fulvescens Breuning, 1973
- Mycerinopsis lacteola (Hope, 1841)
- Mycerinopsis papuana Breuning, 1958
- Mycerinopsis spinipennis Breuning, 1939
- Mycerinopsis uniformis (Pascoe, 1863)

subgenus Zotale

- Mycerinopsis densepunctata Breuning, 1948
- Mycerinopsis excavata Breuning, 1948
- Mycerinopsis lineata (Gahan, 1895)
- Mycerinopsis subuniformis (Pic, 1926)
- Mycerinopsis tonkinea (Pic, 1926)
- Mycerinopsis unicolor (Pascoe, 1866)

incertae sedis

- Mycerinopsis apomecynoides Hayashi, 1972
- Mycerinopsis roepstorffi Thomson, 1864
