= Mycerinopsis unicolor =

Scientific classification
- Domain: Eukaryota
- Kingdom: Animalia
- Phylum: Arthropoda
- Class: Insecta
- Order: Coleoptera
- Suborder: Polyphaga
- Infraorder: Cucujiformia
- Family: Cerambycidae
- Genus: Mycerinopsis
- Species: M. unicolor

Binomial name
- Mycerinopsis unicolor (Pascoe, 1866)

Species of beetle

Mycerinopsis unicolor is a species of beetle in the family Cerambycidae. It was described by Pascoe in 1866.
