= Mycerinopsis lacteola =

Scientific classification
- Domain: Eukaryota
- Kingdom: Animalia
- Phylum: Arthropoda
- Class: Insecta
- Order: Coleoptera
- Suborder: Polyphaga
- Infraorder: Cucujiformia
- Family: Cerambycidae
- Genus: Mycerinopsis
- Species: M. lacteola

Binomial name
- Mycerinopsis lacteola (Hope, 1841)

Species of beetle

Mycerinopsis lacteola is a species of beetle in the family Cerambycidae. It was described by Hope in 1841.
