= Mycerinopsis flavosignata =

Scientific classification
- Kingdom: Animalia
- Phylum: Arthropoda
- Class: Insecta
- Order: Coleoptera
- Suborder: Polyphaga
- Infraorder: Cucujiformia
- Family: Cerambycidae
- Genus: Mycerinopsis
- Species: M. flavosignata

Binomial name
- Mycerinopsis flavosignata Breuning, 1973

Species of beetle

Mycerinopsis flavosignata is a species of beetle in the family Cerambycidae. It was described by Breuning in 1973.
