= Christiane de Roepstorff =

Danish missionary and editor (1843–1896)

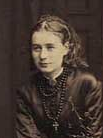

Personal life
- Born: Hedevig Christiane de Roepstorff; 30 November 1843 Copenhagen, Denmark
- Died: 31 August 1896 (aged 52) Frederiksberg, Denmark
- Spouse: Frederik Adolph de Roepstorff (m. 1872; died 1883)
- Occupation: Missionary; editor

Religious life
- Religion: Christianity
- Denomination: Lutheranism

Hedevig Christiane de Roepstorff (née Willemoes; 30 November 1843 – 31 August 1896) was a Danish Lutheran missionary and editor.

== Biography ==
Hedevig Christiane Willemoes was born 30 November 1843 in Copenhagen to Niels Willemoes (1792–1860), an accountant, and Margrethe Magdalene Rostrup (1804–1880). On 5 May 1844, De Roepstorff was baptised in Holmen Parish.

On 11 January 1872, De Roepstorff married Frederik Adolph de Roepstorff, a philologist and writer, whilst he was on home leave from the Nicobar Islands.

The couple later returned to the Nicobar Islands where De Roepstorff worked for the islands Christian mission. Following her husband's murder in 1883, De Roepstorff posthumously published and edited A Dictionary of the Nancowry Dialect of the Nicobarese Language and The Gospel of Matthew in Nicobarese, Nancowry dialect in 1884.

On 31 August 1896 De Roepstorff died in Frederiksberg, aged 52.
