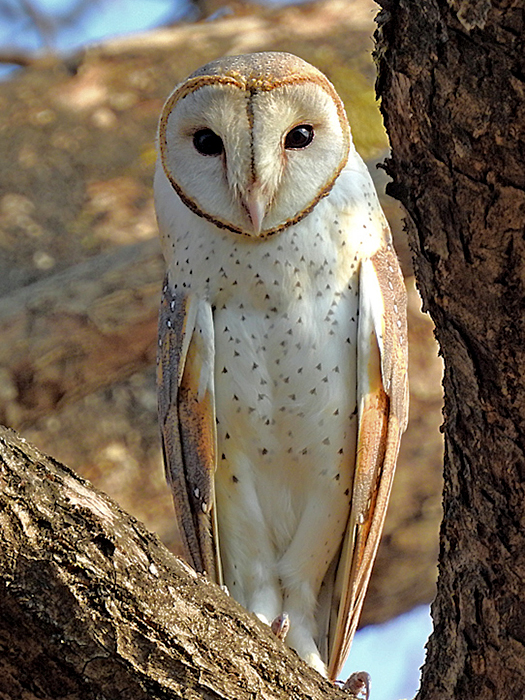
- T. j. stertens Mangaon, Maharashtra, India

Conservation status
- CITES Appendix II

Scientific classification
- Kingdom: Animalia
- Phylum: Chordata
- Class: Aves
- Order: Strigiformes
- Family: Tytonidae
- Genus: Tyto
- Species: T. javanica

Binomial name
- Tyto javanica (Gmelin, 1788)

Subspecies
- Many, see text

Synonyms
- Tyto delicatula Gould, 1837

= Eastern barn owl =

Species of owl

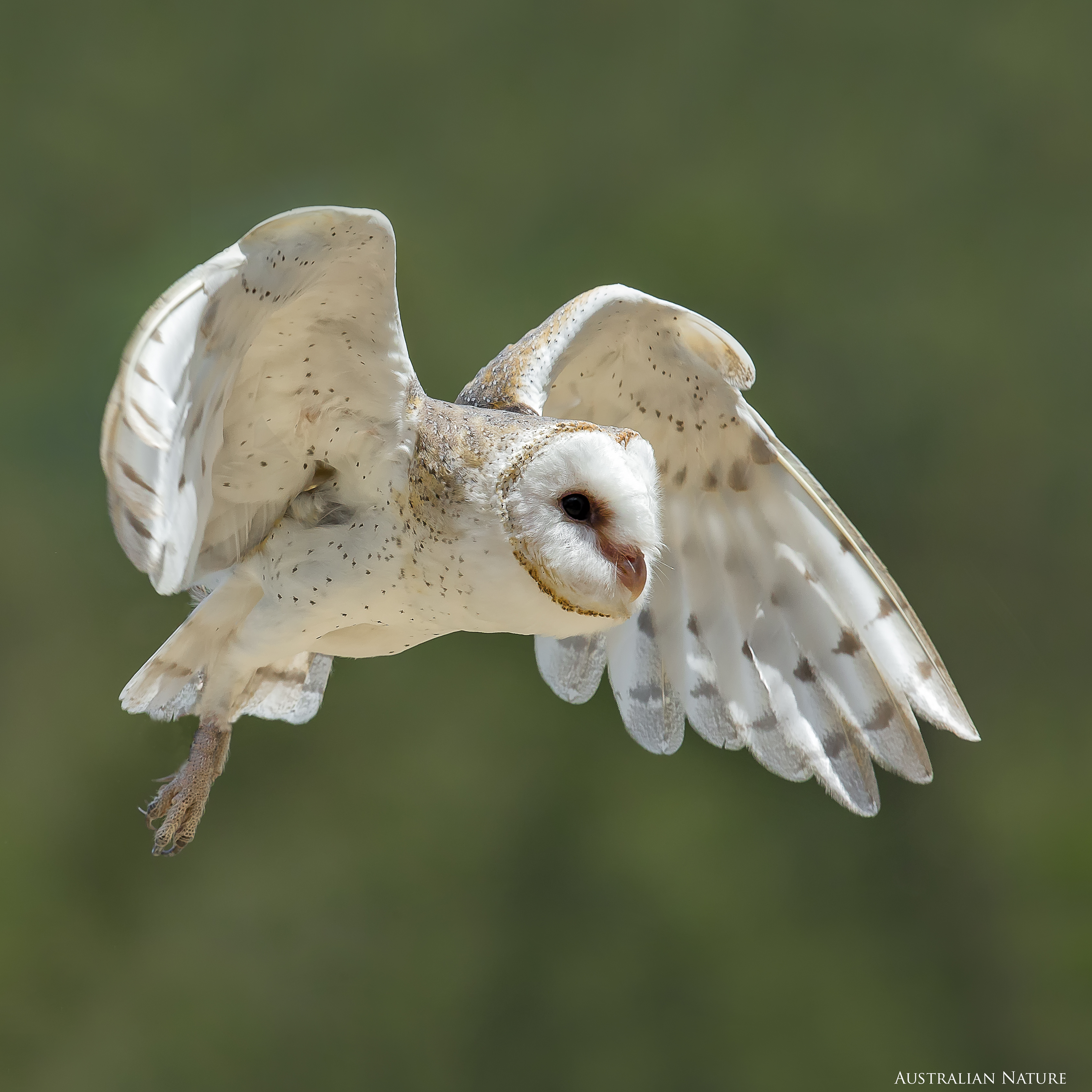
An eastern barn owl takes flight

The Eastern barn owl (Tyto javanica) is usually considered a subspecies group and together with the American barn owl group, the western barn owl group, and sometimes the Andaman masked owl make up the genus Tyto. The cosmopolitan barn owl is recognized by most taxonomic authorities. A few (including the International Ornithologists' Union) separate them into distinct species, as is done here. The eastern barn owl is native to southeastern Asia, New Zealand, and Australasia.

The eastern barn owl is nocturnal over most of its range, but in some Pacific islands, it also hunts by day. They specialise in hunting animals on the ground, and nearly all of their food consists of small mammals which they locate by sound, their hearing being very acute. They mate for life unless one of the pair is killed, after which a new pair bond may be formed. Breeding takes place at varying times of year according to locality, with a clutch, averaging about four eggs, being laid in a nest in a tree hollow, old building or fissure in a cliff. The female does all the incubation, and she and the young chicks are reliant on the male for food. When large numbers of small prey are readily available, barn owl populations can expand rapidly.

König proposed that Tyto alba delicatula should be split off as a separate species, to be known as the eastern barn owl, which would include the subspecies T. d. sumbaensis, T. d. meeki, T. d. crassirostris and T. d. interposita.

== Taxonomy ==
The eastern barn owl was formally described in 1788 by the German naturalist Johann Friedrich Gmelin in his revised and expanded edition of Carl Linnaeus's Systema Naturae. He placed it with the other owls in the genus Strix and coined the binomial name Strix javanica. Gmelin based his description on the "Nachteule von Java" that had been described in 1787 by the German botanist Friedrich von Wurmb. The eastern barn owl is now placed with 16 other owls in the genus Tyto that was introduced in 1828 by the Swedish naturalist Gustaf Johan Billberg.

The barn owl (Tyto alba) was formerly considered to have a global distribution with around 28 subspecies. In the list of birds maintained by Frank Gill, Pamela Rasmussen and David Donsker on behalf of the International Ornithological Committee (IOC) the barn owl is now split into four species: the western barn owl (Tyto alba) (10 subspecies), the American barn owl (Tyto furcata) (12 subspecies), the eastern barn owl (Tyto javanica) (7 subspecies) and the Andaman masked owl (Tyto deroepstorffi). This arrangement is followed here. Some support for this split was provided by a molecular phylogenetic study by Vera Uva and collaborators published in 2018 that compared the DNA sequences of three mitochondrial and one nuclear loci. This split has not been adopted by other taxonomic authorities such as the Clements Checklist of Birds of the World maintained by members of Cornell University or by the list maintained by BirdLife International that is used by the International Union for Conservation of Nature.

Seven subspecies are recognised: In Handbook of Birds of the World, Volume 5: Barn-owls to Hummingbirds, the following subspecies are listed:

| Subspecies | Description | Range | Synonyms |
|---|---|---|---|
| T. j. javanica (J. F. Gmelin, 1788) In Java, Indonesia | Large. Similar to the western barn owl (Tyto alba), but darker above and with conspicuous speckling overall. | The Malay Peninsula through to the southern Greater Sunda Islands (including the Kangean Islands, Krakatoa and the Thousand Islands); the Alor Archipelago; Kalao Island and Tanahjampea Island in the Selayar Islands; Kalaotoa Island and possibly southern Borneo. | Pacific barn owl - Southeast Asian birds are sometimes placed here, but seem closer to stertens. |
| T. j. delicatula (Gould, 1837) In Queensland | Similar to T. alba; slightly darker above, more speckling below. Tail with four dark brown bars. | Australia and offshore islets (not on Tasmania); New Zealand (colonised from 2008); the Lesser Sunda Islands (Savu, Timor, Jaco, Wetar, Kisar, Tanimbar, possibly Rote); Melanesia (New Caledonia and the Loyalty Islands, Aneityum, Erromango and Tanna in southern Vanuatu, the Solomon Islands including Bougainville, Long Island, Nissan, Buka and perhaps New Ireland and northern New Britain); western Polynesia (Fiji, Rotuma, Niue, the Samoan Islands, Tonga and Wallis and Futuna); introduced to Lord Howe Island, but now extirpated there. | Australian barn owl – includes bellonae, everetti, kuehni, lifuensis and lulu. Reports of blackish barn owls on Fiji require investigation. |
| T. j. sumbaensis (Hartert, 1897) | Large, particularly the bill. Similar to javanica; tail whitish with black bars. | Endemic to Sumba. | |
| T. j. meeki (Rothschild & Hartert, 1907) | Large. Similar to javanica; tail whitish with grey bars, underparts silvery-white with arrowhead-shaped speckles (which are larger than in javanica). | Eastern New Guinea, Manam and Karkar Island. | |
| T. j. stertens (Hartert, 1929) | Similar to T. alba, but noticeably speckled below. | Western Pakistan through India east to Yunnan and Vietnam; southern Thailand; northern Sri Lanka. | Southeast Asian birds sometimes included in javanica. |
| T. j. crassirostris (Mayr, 1935) | Similar to delicatula; darker, with stronger bill and feet. | Endemic to the Tanga Islands. | Boang barn owl |
| T. j. interposita (Mayr, 1935) | Similar to delicatula; darker, with orange hue. | The Santa Cruz Islands and the Banks Islands south to Efate Island (Vanuatu). | |
| T. j. rosenbergii (Schlegel, 1866) | Charcoal grey with scattered white spots and streaks. | Endemic to the Indonesian islands of Sulawesi, Sangihe and Peleng. | Sulawesi masked owl |
| T. j. nigrobrunnea (Neumann, 1939) | Very dark. | Endemic to Taliabu Island of Indonesia. | Taliabu masked owl |

== Distribution ==
The eastern barn owl occurs on the Indian subcontinent, Southeast Asia, Australia, and many Pacific Islands. In general it is considered to be sedentary, and indeed many individuals, having taken up residence in a particular location, remain there even when better foraging areas nearby become vacant.

In Australia there is some migration as the birds move towards the northern coast in the dry season and southward in the wet, and also nomadic movements in association with rodent plagues. Occasionally, some of these birds turn up on Norfolk Island, Lord Howe Island or New Zealand, showing that crossing the ocean is not beyond their capabilities. In 2008, eastern barn owls were recorded for the first time breeding in New Zealand.

== Behaviour and ecology ==
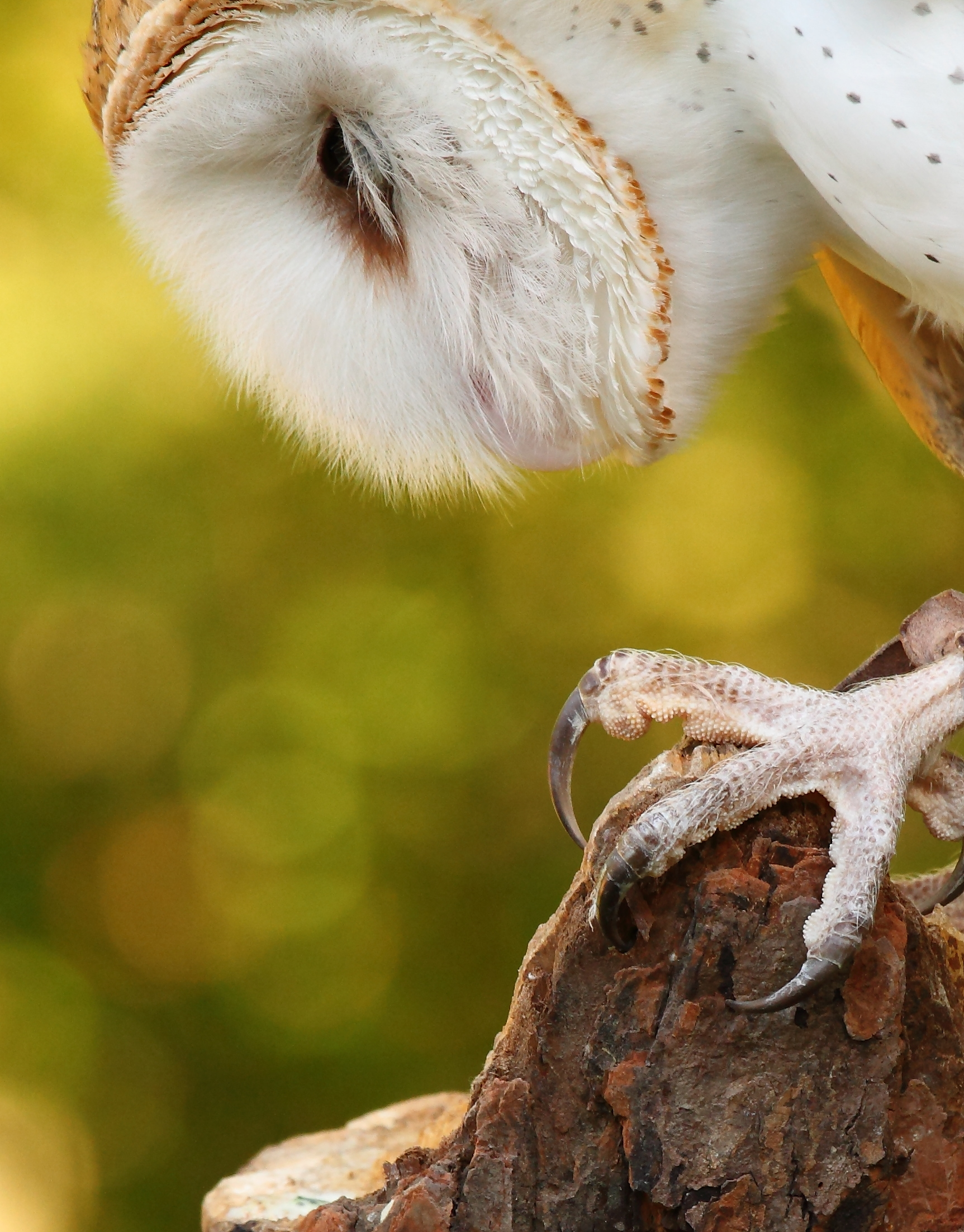
A barn owl's talons

Like most owls, the barn owl is nocturnal, relying on its acute sense of hearing when hunting in complete darkness. It often becomes active shortly before dusk and can sometimes be seen during the day when relocating from one roosting site to another. On various Pacific Islands and perhaps elsewhere, it sometimes hunts by day. This practice may depend on whether the owl is mobbed by other birds if it emerges in daylight.

The barn owl is a bird of open country such as farmland or grassland with some interspersed woodland, usually at altitudes below 2,000 metres (6,600 ft) but occasionally as high as 3,000 metres (9,800 ft) in the tropics. This owl prefers to hunt along the edges of woods or in rough grass strips adjoining pasture. It has an effortless wavering flight as it quarters the ground, alert to the sounds made by potential prey. Like most owls, the barn owl flies silently; tiny serrations on the leading edges of its flight feathers and a hairlike fringe to the trailing edges help to break up the flow of air over the wings, thereby reducing turbulence and the noise that accompanies it. Hairlike extensions to the barbules of its feathers, which give the plumage a soft feel, also minimise noise produced during wingbeats.

Items consumed can be ascertained from identifying the prey fragments in the pellets of indigestible matter that the bird regurgitates. Studies of diet have been made in most parts of the bird's range, and in moist temperate areas over 90% of the prey tends to be small mammals, whereas in hot, dry, unproductive areas, the proportion is lower, and a great variety of other creatures are eaten depending on local abundance. Most prey is terrestrial (mainly small rodents, such as mice, small rats and voles, and small marsupials), but bats and birds are also taken, as well as lizards, amphibians, insects and spiders. Even when they are plentiful and other prey scarce, earthworms do not seem to be consumed.

Mice and rats form the main foodstuffs in the tropics, subtropics and Australia. Barn owls are usually more specialist feeders in productive areas and generalists in drier areas. Locally superabundant rodent species in the weight class of several grams per individual usually make up the single largest proportion of prey. The barn owl hunts by flying slowly, quartering the ground and hovering over spots that may conceal prey. It may also use branches, fence posts or other lookouts to scan its surroundings, and this is the main means of prey location in the oil palm plantations of Malaysia. The bird has long, broad wings, enabling it to manoeuvre and turn abruptly. Its legs and toes are long and slender which improves its ability to forage among dense foliage or beneath the snow and gives it a wide spread of talons when attacking prey. Studies have shown that an individual barn owl may eat one or more voles (or their equivalent) per night, equivalent to about twenty-three percent of the bird's bodyweight. Excess food is often cached at roosting sites and can be used when food is scarce.

On bird-rich islands, a barn owl might include some fifteen to twenty percent of birds in its diet.

The barn owl has acute hearing, with ears placed asymmetrically. This improves detection of sound position and distance and the bird does not require sight to hunt. The facial disc plays a part in this process, as is shown by the fact that with the ruff feathers removed, the bird can still locate the source in azimuth but fails to do so in elevation. Hunting nocturnally or crepuscularly, this bird can target its prey and dive to the ground, penetrating its talons through snow, grass or brush to seize small creatures with deadly accuracy. Compared to other owls of similar size, the barn owl has a much higher metabolic rate, requiring relatively more food. Weight for weight, barn owls consume more rodents—often regarded as pests by humans—than possibly any other creature. This makes the barn owl one of the most economically valuable wildlife animals for agriculture.

=== Breeding ===
Barn owls living in tropical regions can breed at any time of year, but some seasonality in nesting is still evident. Where there are distinct wet and dry seasons, egg-laying usually takes place during the dry season, with increased rodent prey becoming available to the birds as the vegetation dies off. In arid regions, such as parts of Australia, breeding may be irregular and may happen in wet periods, triggered by temporary increases in the populations of small mammals.

Females are ready to breed at ten to eleven months of age although males sometimes wait till the following year. Barn owls are usually monogamous, sticking to one partner for life unless one of the pair dies. During the non-breeding season they may roost separately, but as the breeding season approaches they return to their established nesting site, showing considerable site fidelity. In colder climates, in harsh weather and where winter food supplies may be scarce, they may roost in farm buildings and in barns between hay bales, but they then run the risk that their selected nesting hole may be taken over by some other, earlier-nesting species. Single males may establish feeding territories, patrolling the hunting areas, occasionally stopping to hover, and perching on lofty eminences where they screech to attract a mate. Where a female has lost her mate but maintained her breeding site, she usually seems to manage to attract a new spouse.

Once a pair-bond has been formed, the male will make short flights at dusk around the nesting and roosting sites and then longer circuits to establish a home range. When he is later joined by the female, there is much chasing, turning and twisting in flight, and frequent screeches, the male's being high-pitched and tremulous and the female's lower and harsher. At later stages of courtship, the male emerges at dusk, climbs high into the sky and then swoops back to the vicinity of the female at speed. He then sets off to forage. The female meanwhile sits in an eminent position and preens, returning to the nest a minute or two before the male arrives with food for her. Such feeding behaviour of the female by the male is common, helps build the pair-bond and increases the female's fitness before egg-laying commences.

Barn owls are cavity nesters. They choose holes in trees, and fissures in cliff faces. No nesting material is used as such but, as the female sits incubating the eggs, she draws in the dry furry material of which her regurgitated pellets are composed, so that by the time the chicks are hatched, they are surrounded by a carpet of shredded pellets.

Before commencing laying, the female spends much time near the nest and is entirely provisioned by the male. Meanwhile, the male roosts nearby and may cache any prey that is surplus to their requirements. When the female has reached peak weight, the male provides a ritual presentation of food and copulation occurs at the nest. The female lays eggs on alternate days and the clutch size averages about five eggs (range two to nine). The eggs are chalky white, somewhat elliptical and about the size of bantam's eggs, and incubation begins as soon as the first egg is laid. While she is sitting on the nest, the male is constantly bringing more provisions and they may pile up beside the female. The incubation period is about thirty days, hatching takes place over a prolonged period and the youngest chick may be several weeks younger than its oldest sibling. In years with plentiful supplies of food, there may be a hatching success rate of about 75%. The male continues to copulate with the female when he brings food which makes the newly hatched chicks vulnerable to injury.

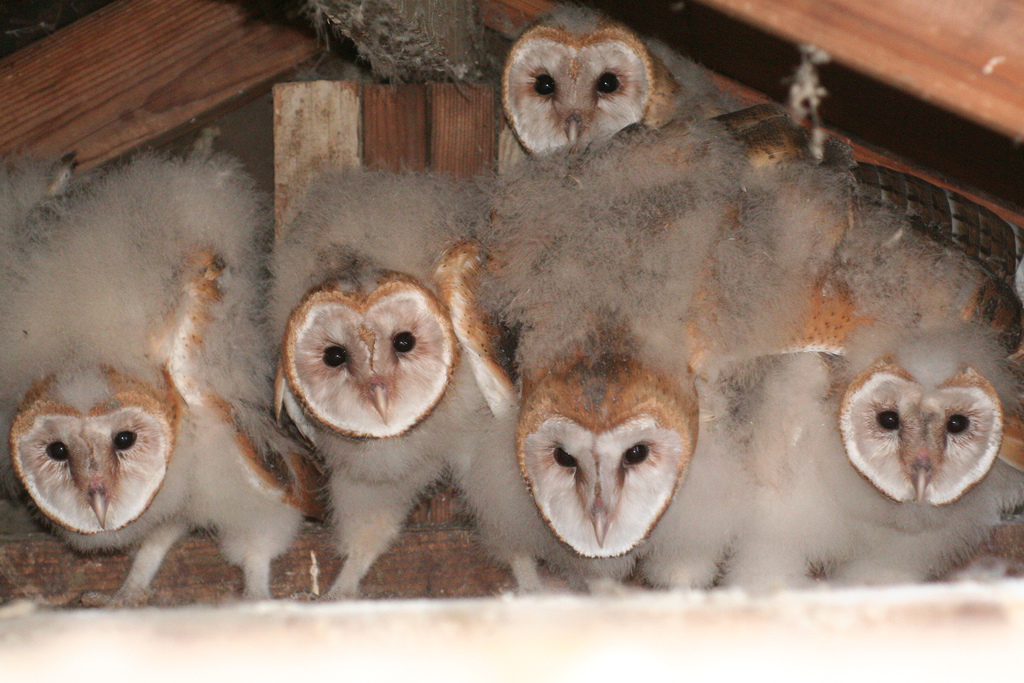
Brood prior to fledging, beginning to shed their nestling down

The chicks are at first covered with greyish-white down and develop rapidly. Within a week they can hold their heads up and shuffle around in the nest. The female tears up the food brought by the male and distributes it to the chicks. Initially these make a "chittering" sound but this soon changes into a food-demanding "snore". By two weeks old they are already half their adult weight and look naked as the amount of down is insufficient to cover their growing bodies. By three weeks old, quills are starting to push through the skin and the chicks stand, making snoring noises with wings raised and tail stumps waggling, begging for food items which are now given whole. The male is the main provider of food until all the chicks are at least four weeks old at which time the female begins to leave the nest and starts to roost elsewhere. By the sixth week the chicks are as big as the adults but have slimmed down somewhat by the ninth week when they are fully fledged and start leaving the nest briefly themselves. They are still dependent on the parent birds until about thirteen weeks and receive training from the female in finding, and eventually catching, prey.

=== Moulting ===
Feathers become abraded over time and all birds need to replace them at intervals. Barn owls are particularly dependent on their ability to fly quietly and manoeuvre efficiently, and in temperate areas their prolonged moult lasts through three phases over a period of two years. The female starts to moult while incubating the eggs and brooding the chicks, a time when the male feeds her so she does not need to fly much. The first primary feather to be shed is the central one, number 6, and it has regrown completely by the time the female resumes hunting. Feathers 4, 5, 7 and 8 are dropped at a similar time the following year and feathers 1, 2, 3, 9 and 10 in the bird's third year of adulthood. The secondary and tail feathers are lost and replaced over a similar timescale, again starting while incubation is taking place. In the case of the tail, the two outermost tail feathers are first shed followed by the two central ones, the other tail feathers being moulted the following year.

In temperate areas, the male owl moults rather later in the year than the female, at a time when there is an abundance of food, the female has recommenced hunting and the demands of the chicks are lessening. Unmated males without family responsibilities often start losing feathers earlier in the year. The moult follows a similar prolonged pattern to that of the female and the first sign that the male is moulting is often when a tail feather has been dropped at the roost. A consequence of moulting is the loss of thermal insulation. This is of little importance in the tropics and barn owls here usually moult a complete complement of flight feathers annually. The hot-climate moult may still take place over a long period but is usually concentrated at a particular time of year outside the breeding season. >

Three barn owl chicks threatening an intruder

When disturbed at its roosting site, an angry barn owl lowers its head and sways it from side to side, or the head may be lowered and stretched forward and the wings drooped while the bird emits hisses and makes snapping noises with its beak. A defensive attitude involves lying flat on the ground or crouching with wings spread out.

=== Lifespan ===
Unusually for such a medium-sized carnivorous animal, the barn owl exhibits r-selection, producing large number of offspring with a high growth rate, many of which have a relatively low probability of surviving to adulthood. While wild barn owls are thus decidedly short-lived, the actual longevity of the species is much higher – captive individuals may reach twenty years of age or more. But occasionally, a wild bird reaches an advanced age. Taking into account such extremely long-lived individuals, the average lifespan is about four years, and statistically two-thirds to three-quarters of all adults survive from one year to the next.

The most significant cause of death in temperate areas is likely to be starvation, particularly over the autumn and winter period when first year birds are still perfecting their hunting skills. In northern and upland areas, there is some correlation between mortality in older birds and adverse weather, deep-lying snow and prolonged low temperatures. Collision with road vehicles is another cause of mortality, and may result when birds forage on mown verges. Some of these birds are in poor condition and may have been less able to evade oncoming vehicles than fit individuals would have been. Historically, many deaths were caused by the use of pesticides, and this may still be the case in some parts of the world.

== Status and conservation ==
In some areas, it may be an insufficiency of suitable nesting sites that is the factor limiting barn owl numbers. The provision of nest boxes under the eaves of buildings and in other locations can be very successful in increasing the local population. In Malaysia, large areas of rainforest were felled to make way for oil palm plantations and with few tree cavities for breeding, the barn owl population, with its ability to control rodent pests, diminished. The provision of two hundred nest boxes in a trial saw almost one hundred percent occupancy and as the programme expanded, the plantations supported one of the densest barn owl populations in the world. Similarly, providing nesting boxes has increased the number of barn owls in rice-growing areas of Malaysia where the rodents do much damage to the crop. However, although barn owl numbers have increased in both these instances, it is unclear as to how effective this biological control of the rats is as compared to the trapping and baiting that occurred previously.

== Bibliography ==
- Bruce, M. D. (1999). "Family Tytonidae (Barn-owls)". In del Hoyo, J.; Elliott, A.; Sargatal, J. (eds.). Handbook of Birds of the World, Volume 5: Barn-owls to Hummingbirds. Lynx Edicions. ISBN 84-87334-25-3.
