= Mycerinopsis papuana =

Scientific classification
- Kingdom: Animalia
- Phylum: Arthropoda
- Class: Insecta
- Order: Coleoptera
- Suborder: Polyphaga
- Infraorder: Cucujiformia
- Family: Cerambycidae
- Genus: Mycerinopsis
- Species: M. papuana

Binomial name
- Mycerinopsis papuana Breuning, 1958

Species of beetle

Mycerinopsis papuana is a species of beetle in the family Cerambycidae. It was described by Breuning in 1958.
