= Frederik Adolph de Roepstorff =

Danish philologist

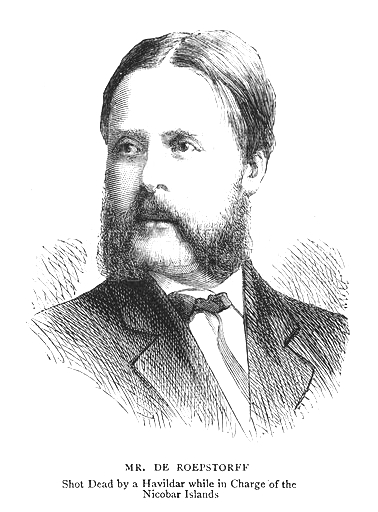
- Engraving from The Graphic 17 May 1884]
- Born: 25 March 1842; Atlantic Ocean near the Cape of Good Hope, Cape Colony
- Died: 24 October 1883 (aged 41); Kamorta, Nicobar Islands, British Raj
- Spouse: Christiane de Roepstorff (m. 1872)

Frederik Adolph de Roepstorff (25 March 1842 – 24 October 1883) was a Danish philologist and writer who worked in the Andaman penal colony in India, where he was shot dead by a convict. He studied the languages of Andaman and Nicobar tribes and collected numerous natural history specimens. The Andaman masked owl (Tyto deroepstorffi) was named after him by Hume.

== Early life and education ==
De Roepstorff was born on 25 March 1842 aboard an English ship sailing from Madras to England near the Cape of Good Hope to Adolph de Roepstorff and Charlotte Georgiana Holmes (née Farley). Baptized in Cape Town, De Roepstorff's birth entitled him to British citizenship.

Raised in Denmark, De Roepstorff was a naval cadet and graduated from the Horsens Statsskole in 1863. The following year De Roepstorff took the filosofikum.

== Career ==
Forced to give up his studies for financial reasons, De Roepstorff went to India in 1867 and became an extra assistant superintendent in the Andaman Islands penal colony and later became in-charge of the Nicobar Islands. His work was to supervise the prisoners. The penal settlement largely consisted of Indian sepoys from the 1857 rebellion. Following his marriage to Christiane de Roepstorff in 1871, De Roepstorff returned to the Nicobar Islands in 1878.

De Roepstorff was a member of several scholarly societies including the Asiatic Society of Bengal to whose journal he contributed notes. In his spare time he took a great interest in the fauna and flora, collecting specimens for the Indian Museum, as well as sending them to specialists in Europe. He also explored the region and wrote to various journals of ethnology and geographical exploration. He was familiar with Danish Kjokkenmoddings (kitchen midden) and recognized the antiquity of shell heaps in the Andamans. With geologist Ferdinand Stoliczka, he explored a kitchen midden in the Andamans that they dated to the Neolithic period. He also helped set up the Nicobar Islands Eclipse station to observe the total solar eclipse of 6 April 1875. The scientific team included Captain J. Waterhouse, Professor A. Pedler and Pietro Tacchini. As an ethnologist, he also recorded stories and beliefs. In one publication, he notes that the Nicobarese had a rule that the name of a dead person should never be mentioned. This essentially meant that they could not have an oral history. De Roepstorff and his wife were both interested in linguistics, philology, and ethnography and they compiled a dictionary of the Nancowry dialect. They also edited a translation of the Gospel of Matthew into Nicobarese which had been begun by Moravian missionaries and this was published after his death by his wife in 1884. His work on linguistics was continued by his successor Edward Horace Man. He also collected specimens of birds from the Islands and corresponded with A.O. Hume who named it Strix De-Roepstorffi (now Tyto deroepstorffi) after him in 1875. He contributed insects, molluscs, and snake specimens to the Indian Museum. Several insects described from his collections bear his name - including Eurema blanda roepstorffi, Euploea midamus roepstorffi, Prosopeas roepstorffi, Hebomoia glaucippe roepstorffi and Dicheros roepstorffi. He sent molluscs to the Indian Museum among which he named one species as Ennea (Huttonella) moerchiana after his Danish collaborator Otto Andreas Lowson Mörch in a manuscript, a name that was retained in the formal description by Geoffrey Nevill. His collections of molluscs were made available to H.H. Godwin-Austen by Christiane after her husband's death.

== Death ==
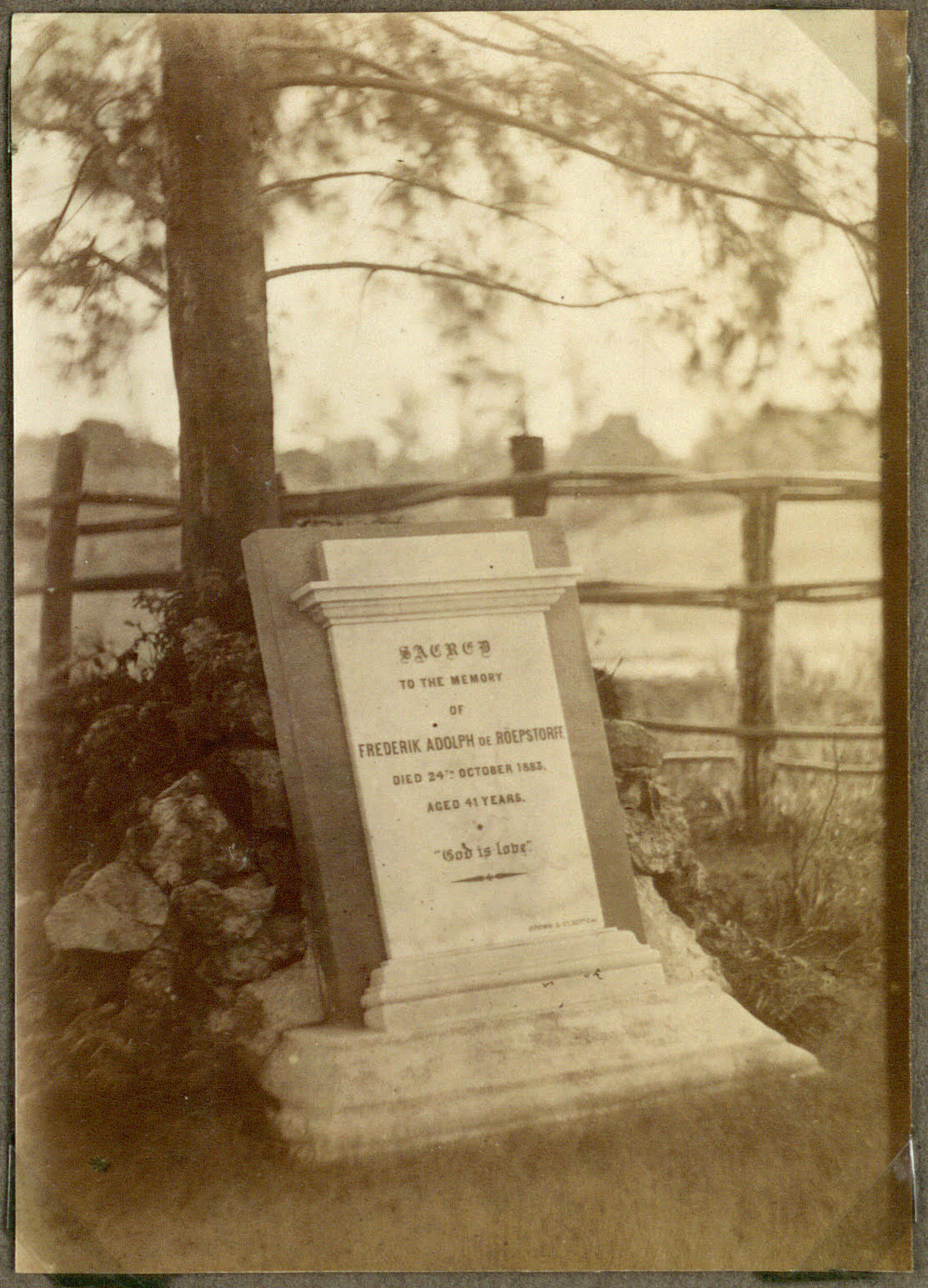
Photograph of grave in Nancowry from the Danish Museum

The death of Roepstorff has two versions. In one, a small group of Indian soldiers had been posted to Kamorta where one was reported stealing coconuts from the natives. He was reprimanded by Roepstorff with the threat of being sent off to Port Blair. The next morning, as de Roepstorff was mounting his horse, the aggrieved soldier shot him and injured him grievously. He sent off a letter to the Andamans but died before help could arrive. He was nursed by the Nicobarese who refused to let Indians near him and buried him after he died. The other version, said to be of greater veracity, is that a havildar from the Madras army stationed at Nankauri was on trial for assaulting a convict. The case had been adjourned by de Roepstorff and, afraid of being dismissed from the army, he had taken a shot at de Roepstorff who was riding by. When he found that he had mortally wounded de Roepstorff, he shot himself. It took five days for the news to reach, and for officials to arrive, leaving Mrs de Roepstorff to deal with the situation on her own. His grave was described as being in ‘the little Camorta graveyard, where the bluff near the English settlement overlooks the beautiful Nancowry harbour, and the nestling huts of the natives whom he loved so well’. The grave of Nicolas Shimmings was next to his.

== Personal life ==
On 11 January 1872, De Roepstorff married Christiane de Roepstorff, a Christian missionary and later editor, whilst he was on home leave from the Nicobar Islands.
