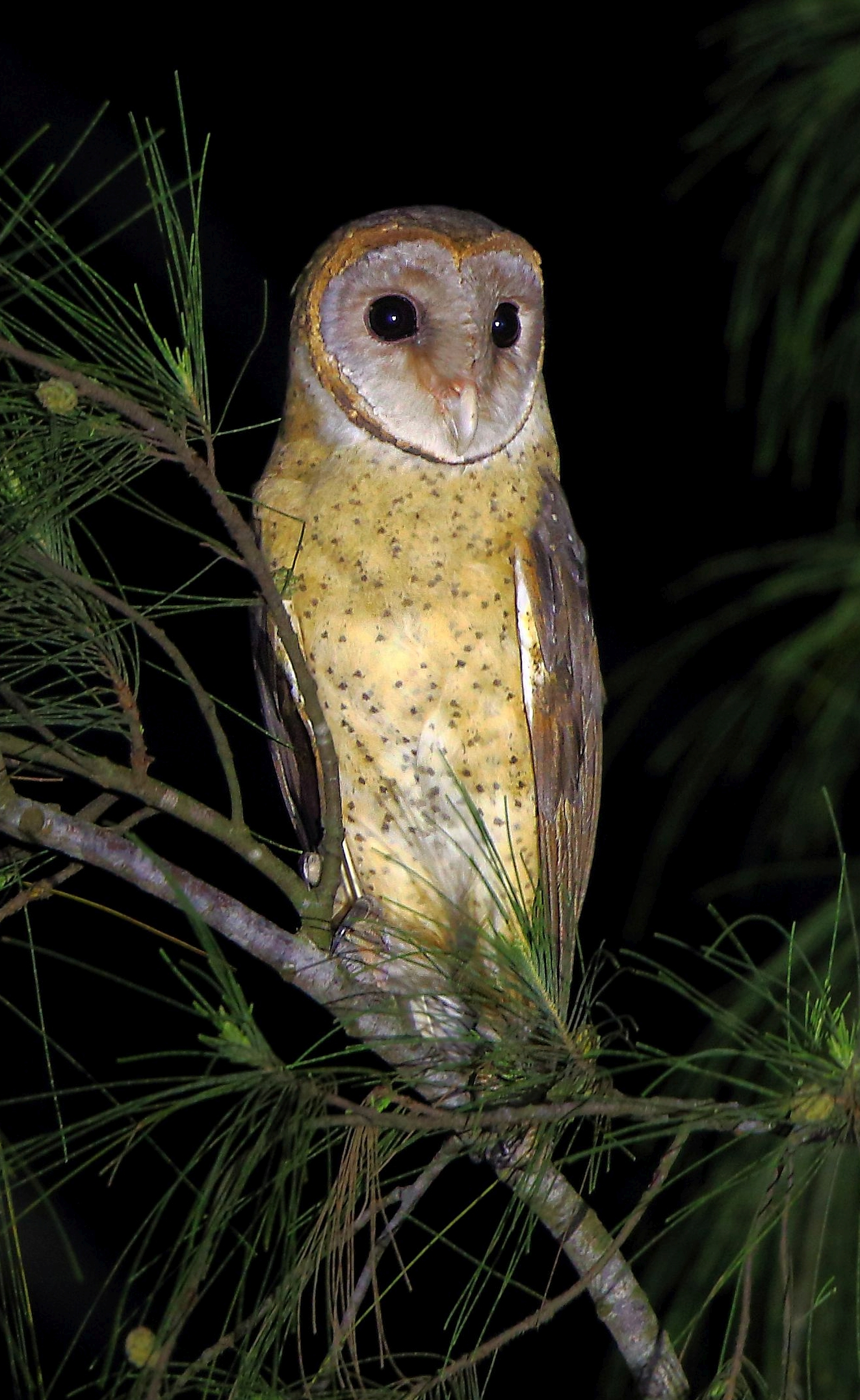

Conservation status
- CITES Appendix II

Scientific classification
- Kingdom: Animalia
- Phylum: Chordata
- Class: Aves
- Order: Strigiformes
- Family: Tytonidae
- Genus: Tyto
- Species: T. deroepstorffi

Binomial name
- Tyto deroepstorffi (Hume, 1875)
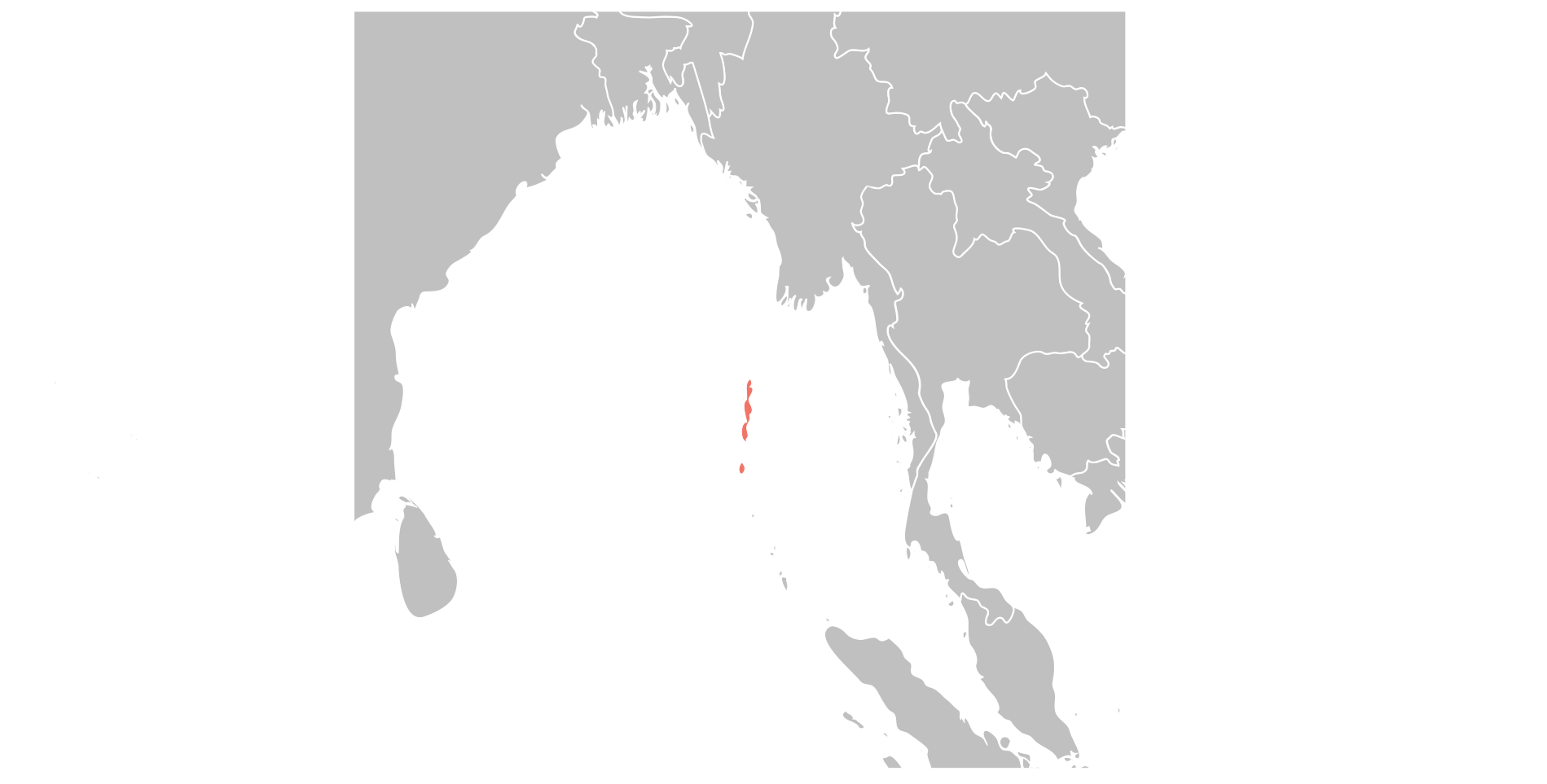

= Andaman masked owl =

Species of owl

The Andaman masked owl (Tyto deroepstorffi) is a barn owl endemic to the southern Andaman Islands archipelago of India, in the Bay of Bengal, Indian Ocean. Regarded by some authors as a subspecies of the common barn owl (Tyto alba), it is recognized by others as a species in its own right.

== Taxonomy ==
The species was named by Allan Octavian Hume after the collector Frederik Adolph de Roepstorff who shot it at Aberdeen, Andamans. Hume placed it in the genus Strix. Some authors consider this bird to be a subspecies of the barn owl/western barn owl (Tyto alba), or the eastern barn owl (Tyto javanica), but König, in his Owls of the World, recognized it as a distinct species; one distinguishing feature is that it lacks the greyish veil, speckled with black and white, that all other races of Tyto alba / Tyto javanica possess.

== Description ==
The Andaman masked owl has a length of between 30 and 36 cm (12 and 14 in) from head to tail, with the tail being 11 cm (4.3 in) from its base. The longest primary measures 25-26 cm. It is almost uniformly dark reddish-brown above, with some speckling of buffish-orange, and a more yellowish torso than the common barn owl. The facial disc is pale, reddish-buff with a distinctive orange-brown margin. The eyes are blackish and the beak is creamy-white. The breast is golden-brown with blackish spots, paling towards the belly, which is whitish. The legs are fully feathered to near the feet. The toes are greyish-pink and the claws purplish-grey. The voice has been described as a rather high-pitched, short, rasping, descending shriek which terminates abruptly and is repeated several times.

== Distribution and habitat ==
The Andaman masked owl is known only from the southern Andaman Islands. It occurs on the coastal plain, in fields and gardens with trees, and in human settlements. It is not thought to be migratory.

== Ecology ==
Little is known of the habits of this owl but they are likely to be similar to those of other related species. It is nocturnal, roosting during the day and emerging at dusk. It feeds on small rodents, and the bones of mice and rats have been found in regurgitated pellets beneath roosting places. It probably nests in cavities but details of its breeding habits are not known.
