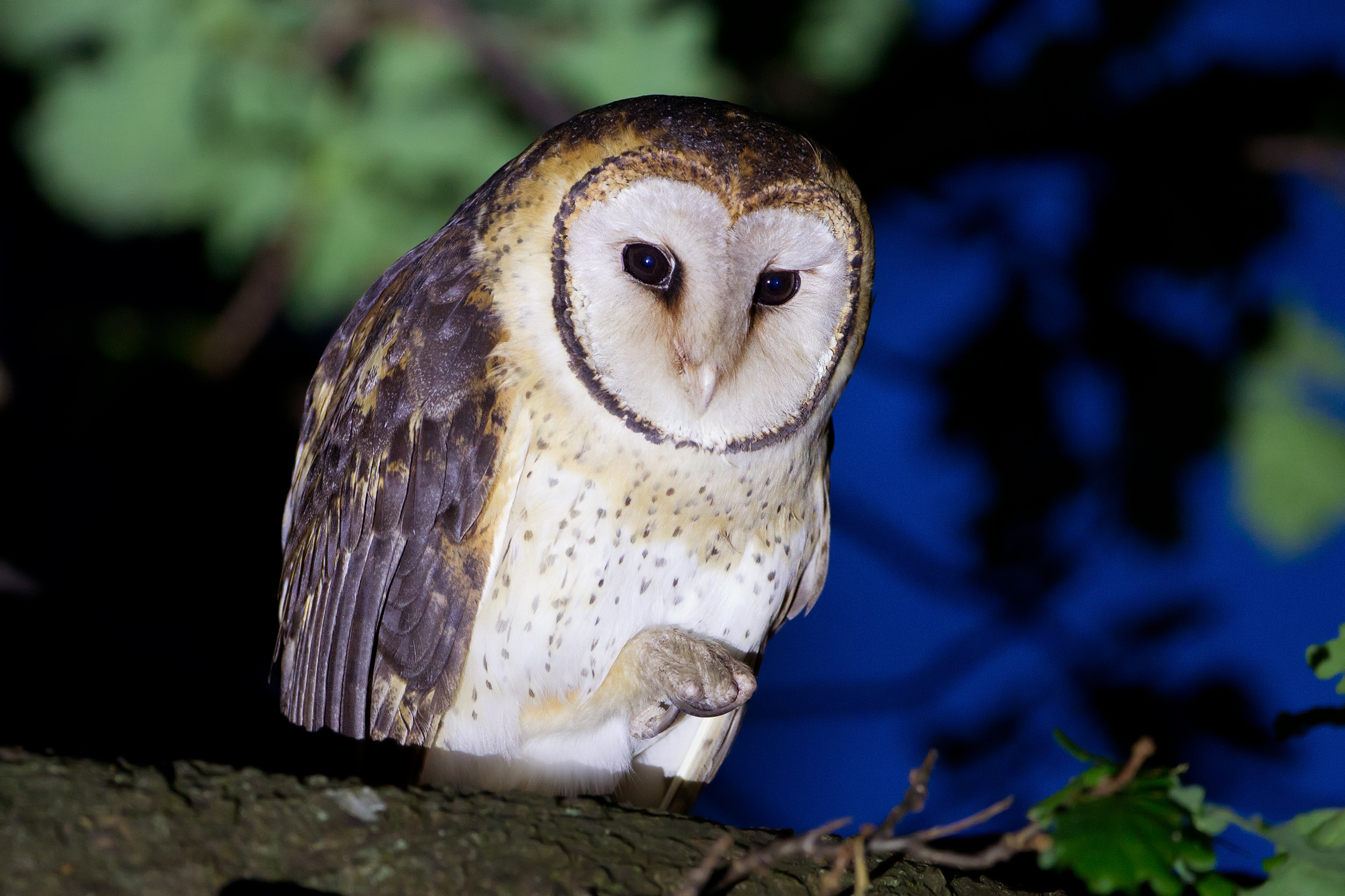
- Male

Conservation status
- Vulnerable (EPBC Act)

Scientific classification
- Kingdom: Animalia
- Phylum: Chordata
- Class: Aves
- Order: Strigiformes
- Family: Tytonidae
- Genus: Tyto
- Species: T. novaehollandiae
- Subspecies: T. n. castanops

Trinomial name
- Tyto novaehollandiae castanops (Gould, 1837)

Synonyms
- Strix castanops Gould, 1837; Tyto castanops

= Tasmanian masked owl =

Subspecies of bird

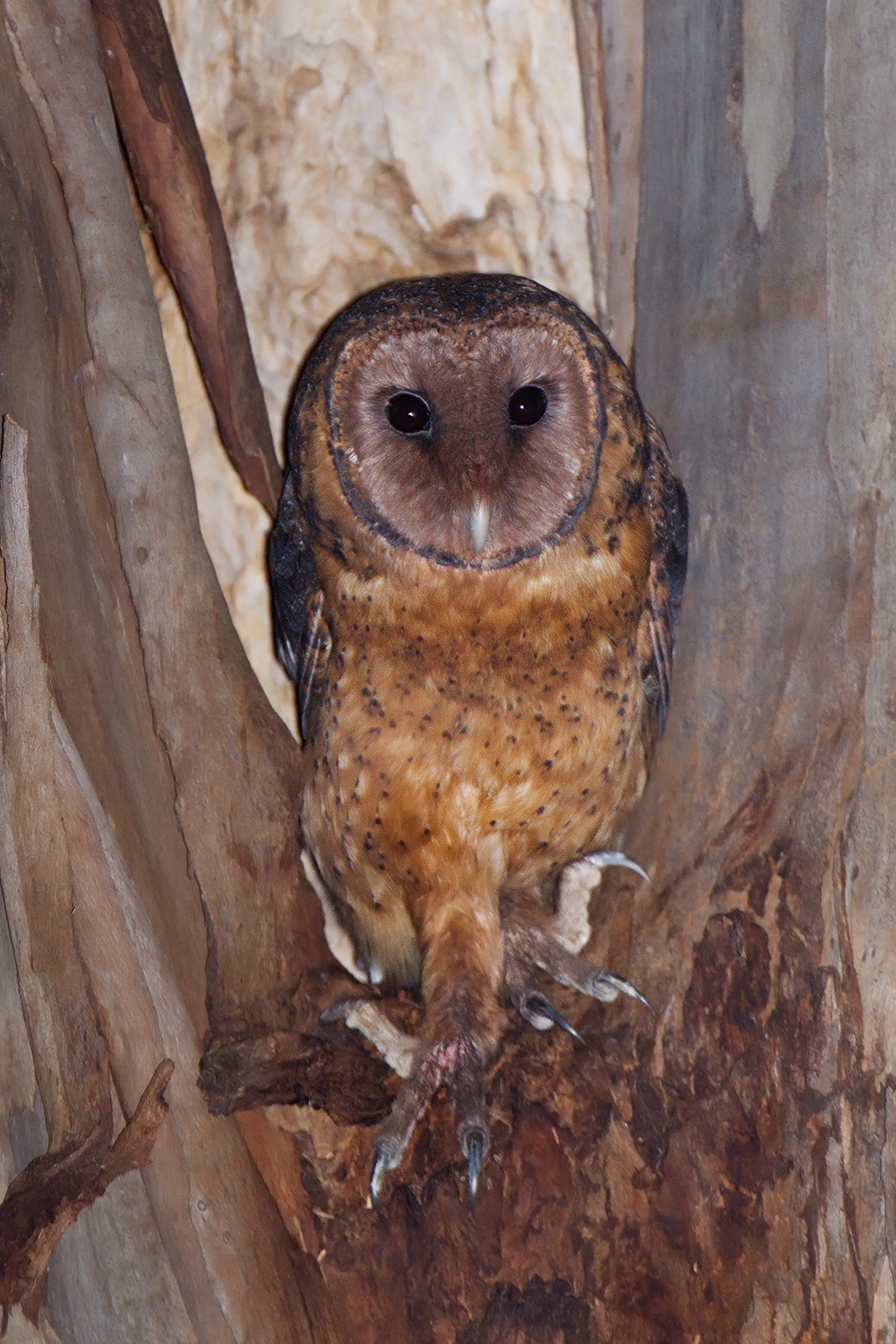
Female

The Tasmanian masked owl (Tyto novaehollandiae castanops) is a bird in the barn owl family Tytonidae that is endemic to the island state of Tasmania, Australia. It is the largest subspecies of the Australian masked owl, the largest Tyto owl in the world, and is sometimes considered a full species. The subspecific name castanops, meaning "chestnut-faced", comes from the colouring of the facial disc. It was first described by John Gould (as Strix castanops), who wrote about it in his Handbook to the Birds of Australia as:

"…a species distinguished from all the other members of its genus by its great size and powerful form. Probably few of the Raptorial birds, with the exception of the Eagles, are more formidable or more sanguinary in disposition."

"Forests of large but thinly scattered trees, skirting plains and open districts, constitute its natural habitat. Strictly nocturnal in its habits, as night approaches it sallies forth from the hollows of the large gum-trees, and flaps slowly and noiselessly over the plains and swamps in search of its prey, which consists of rats and small quadrupeds generally."

== Description ==
Tasmanian masked owls are not only large, but robust. They closely resemble a barn owl, however are many times larger. Females weigh up to 1.26 kilograms (2.8 lb) with a wingspan of up to 129 centimetres (51 in). Their plumage is mainly a variable combination of browns and greys, generally darker than the other Australian subspecies. Their upper parts are dark brown to pale chestnut, with white speckling. Females are considerably darker, as well as larger, than the males, ranging from 43 to 57 centimetres (17 to 22 in) in length, compared with the males’ 35 to 42 centimetres (14 to 17 in). They have broad, black-bordered, buff to chestnut facial discs, and fully feathered legs with powerful feet and long talons.

== Distribution and habitat ==
The natural range of the owl is limited to Tasmania, where it has been recorded throughout the state, with the exception of the south-west. The owls inhabit both wet and dry eucalypt forests, woodlands and adjoining areas of agricultural land. Preferred habitat is areas close to the forest edge, containing a mosaic of understorey components. They require large old-growth trees with capacious hollows for nesting. The home range of a breeding pair may be more than 10 km^{2} (3.9 sq mi); areas identified as important for breeding include the east coast between Hobart and St Marys, the Derwent and Huon Valleys and the mid-north coast, as well as fragmented patches in the Tamar Valley and the north-east coast. It has been recorded from Maria and Bruny Islands.

The owl has also been successfully introduced to Lord Howe Island, a subtropical territory of New South Wales in the Tasman Sea between Australia and New Zealand, where it is considered an invasive species.

== Behaviour ==
These owls are secretive, relatively silent, and strictly nocturnal birds. They roost during the day, usually in trees in dense foliage or hollows, as well as in rocky overhangs and caves, and occasionally in farm sheds and other open buildings.

=== Breeding ===
These owls breed as territorial and monogamous pairs. They nest in large tree hollows with a floor of decaying wood debris. The female is fed by the male while incubating a clutch of 2-4 eggs for about 42 days before hatching. The chicks are covered in, at first, white, then creamy down, and fledge in 10–12 weeks. Fledged owls with traces of down may remain in the vicinity of the nest for several weeks. Breeding is seasonal with most eggs laid in spring from late October to early November.

Anecdotally, Tasmanian masked owls were first bred in captivity in 1945 in Launceston by Miss Audrey Lee. However, the first detailed account of such an achievement is by David Fleay, who bred them at the Healesville Sanctuary in Victoria in 1946.

=== Feeding ===
These owls hunt at night, preying on a wide range of animals, from insects to mammals as large as rabbits, bandicoots and brushtail possums. Their main diet includes introduced rodents and rabbits in agricultural areas, and marsupials and native birds in less disturbed habitats. They often hunt from perches using sound to detect prey, which is usually taken on the ground by striking with the feet and using the talons to pierce and kill.

=== Voice ===
Among their calls, Tasmanian masked owls utter a loud, rich, hissing or rasping screech, the call of the female being deeper and harsher than that of the male. They also snap their beaks loudly as a warning against perceived threats.

== Status and conservation ==
=== Tasmania ===
The Tasmanian masked owl is considered to be endangered under the Tasmanian Threatened Species Protection Act 1995, because of its small population (estimated at about 1330 breeding birds, or 615 pairs) as well as ongoing habitat loss, especially of old-growth forest suitable for breeding. An important conservation need is to maintain nesting habitat in production forests. It is also threatened by competition for nest hollows by feral bees, kookaburras and possums.

=== Lord Howe Island ===
Between December 1922 and October 1930 almost 100 masked owls, mostly from Tasmania, were introduced to Lord Howe Island in an unsuccessful attempt to control black rats. The population there is considered to be a threat to the endemic Lord Howe woodhen and Lord Howe currawong, as well as to breeding seabirds, and is culled when possible.
