= Wongalara Sanctuary =

Nature reserve in the Northern Territory, Australia

Coordinates: 14.111°S 134.477°E

Location in Northern Territory

Wongalara Sanctuary is a nature reserve in the Top End of the Northern Territory of Australia.

== Location ==
It is a pastoral lease on the southern border of Arnhem Land, and is 120 kilometres (75 mi) south-east of Kakadu National Park. The sanctuary shares a boundary with Mainoru Station and vacant crown land to the north, Mountain Valley Station to the west, Lonesome Dove and Big River Stations to the south and Urapunga Aboriginal land trust to the south and South-East Arnhem Land Indigenous Protected Area to the east and southeast.

== Description ==
The sanctuary occupies an area of 1,910 square kilometres (737 sq mi), it is owned and managed by the Australian Wildlife Conservancy (AWC), which acquired it in 2007 following a public fundraising campaign and assistance from the Australian Government in the form of a grant of A$2.1 million from its National Reserve System Program. The Mainoru River, Jalbot River and Wilton River all flow through the area. The nearest major road to the sanctuary is the Central Arnhem Road which cuts through neighbouring properties to the north and east.

== Landscape ==
The landscape of Wongalara includes spinifex-covered ranges, sandstone plateaus and escarpments, eucalypt forests and woodlands, patches of monsoon rainforest and wetlands. The Wilton River flows through the reserve. The dominant vegetation is low open savannah woodland.

== Wildlife ==
Threatened or significant animal species recorded from Wongalara include the northern masked owl, Gouldian finch, crested shrike-tit, hooded parrot, red goshawk, northern quoll, kakadu dunnart and freshwater crocodile. Scientists come to the sanctuary during the dry season to trap and study mammals and conduct other research projects. By 2013 a 1,000 square kilometres (386 sq mi) section of the property has been fenced to protect wildlife from feral pests. Feral cattle, buffalo, horses and pigs have all been excluded from the property. These animals all compete with natives for food and destroy the landscape and thin the vegetation. The cost of the 160 kilometres (99 mi) fence is A$500,000 with plans to fence the entire property creating the largest feral herbivore-free area in Australia.

== See also ==
- List of ranches and stations
