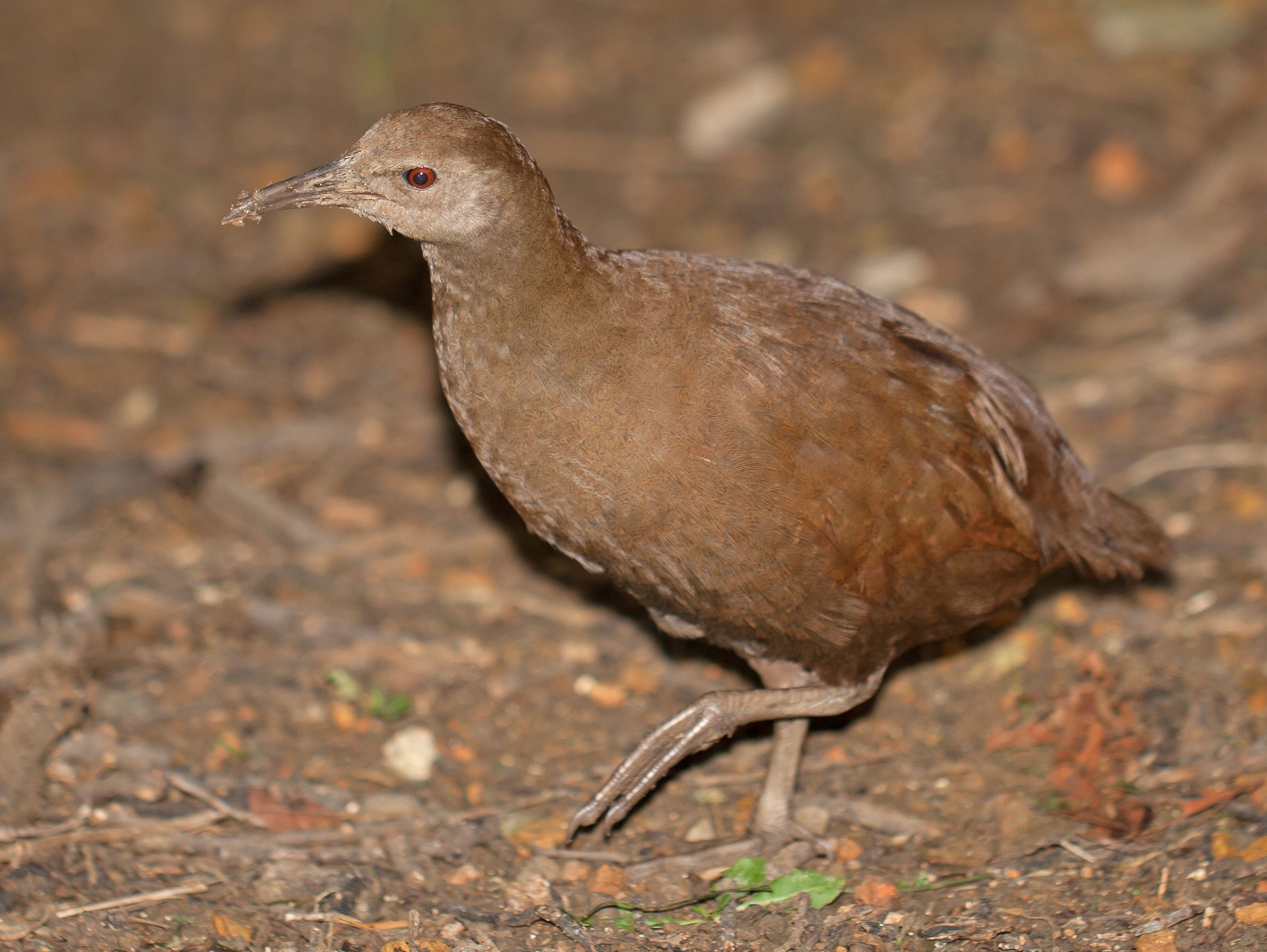

Conservation status
- Endangered (IUCN 3.1)
- CITES Appendix I

Scientific classification
- Kingdom: Animalia
- Phylum: Chordata
- Class: Aves
- Order: Gruiformes
- Family: Rallidae
- Genus: Gallirallus
- Species: G. sylvestris

Binomial name
- Gallirallus sylvestris (Sclater, PL, 1870)

Synonyms
- Ocydromus sylvestris (protonym); Hypotaenidia sylvestris; Tricholimnas sylvestris; Gallirallus

= Lord Howe woodhen =

Species of bird

The Lord Howe woodhen (Gallirallus sylvestris) also known as the Lord Howe Island woodhen, Lord Howe wood rail, Lord Howe rail or Lord Howe Island rail, is a flightless bird of the rail family, Rallidae. It is endemic to Lord Howe Island off the Australian coast. It is currently classified as endangered by the IUCN. The species was formerly sometimes placed in the genus Hypotaenidia.

== Description and taxonomy ==
The Lord Howe woodhen is a medium-sized olive-brown rail, with a short tail, downcurved bill, red iris, and chestnut wings. The sexes are alike but the female is smaller. The male measures 34–42 cm (13–17 in) in length, and weighs 410–780 g (0.90–1.72 lb); with a wingspan of 49–52 cm (19–20 in). The female is 32–37 cm (13–15 in) in length, and weighs 330–615 g (0.73–1.4 lb); with a wingspan of 47–49 cm (19–19 in). It is flightless.

The species has historically moved between classification in genera Gallirallus and Hypotaenidia, but both the IOC and AviList now place the species in Gallirallus.

== Ecology ==
The species lives in sub-tropical forests, feeding on earthworms, crustaceans, fruit, and occasionally taking the eggs of shearwaters and petrels.

Woodhens mate for life and are usually encountered in pairs. They are territorial and will appear from the forest's understory to investigate the source of any unusual noise. A mated pair will defend an area of approximately three hectares, with offspring being expelled from this area once grown. The nest is a shallow depression on the ground, in which 1–4 eggs are laid in captivity. They are incubated for 20–23 days.

== Decline and recovery ==
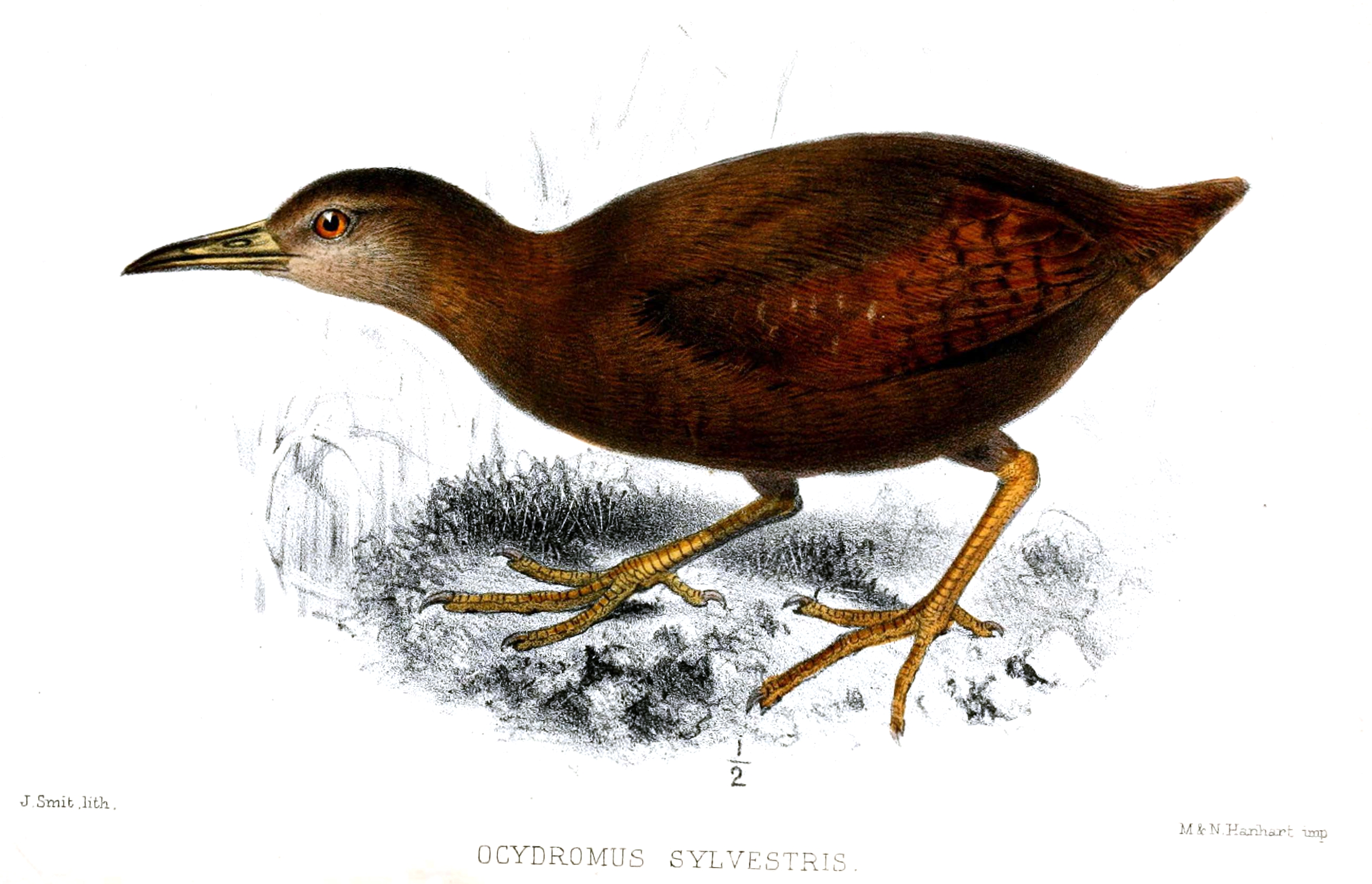
Illustration by Joseph Smit (1869)

Prior its discovery in 1788, Lord Howe Island had no history of human settlement, and when European explorers first arrived the woodhen was one of fifteen terrestrial bird species. Initially common, the woodhen population declined rapidly, and by the late 19th century it had become very rare.

Being flightless, curious, and naive, the woodhen became an easy food source for visiting sailors and early settlers. At the same time, feral pigs – deliberately introduced as an additional food source – likely competed with woodhens for food, and possibly preyed upon the birds or their eggs. Predation by domestic cats and dogs, which arrived with early settlers, as well as habitat destruction by feral goats likely also played a role in the woodhen's decline. Although rats were responsible for the extinction of five of Lord Howe Island's endemic bird species, there was no evidence they played a role in the decline of the woodhen.

When the population was first surveyed in the early 1970s, only a dozen breeding pairs remained, restricted to the inaccessible peaks of the island's two mountains, Mount Gower and Mount Lidgbird. In response, a programme of ex-situ conservation (captive breeding) took place between 1980 and 1984, and 81 individuals were released into the wild, albeit with a low survival rate. At the same time, a series of predator eradication programmes were conducted on the island: the eradication of feral cats (1976–1982), pigs (1979–1985), and goats (1999–2001).

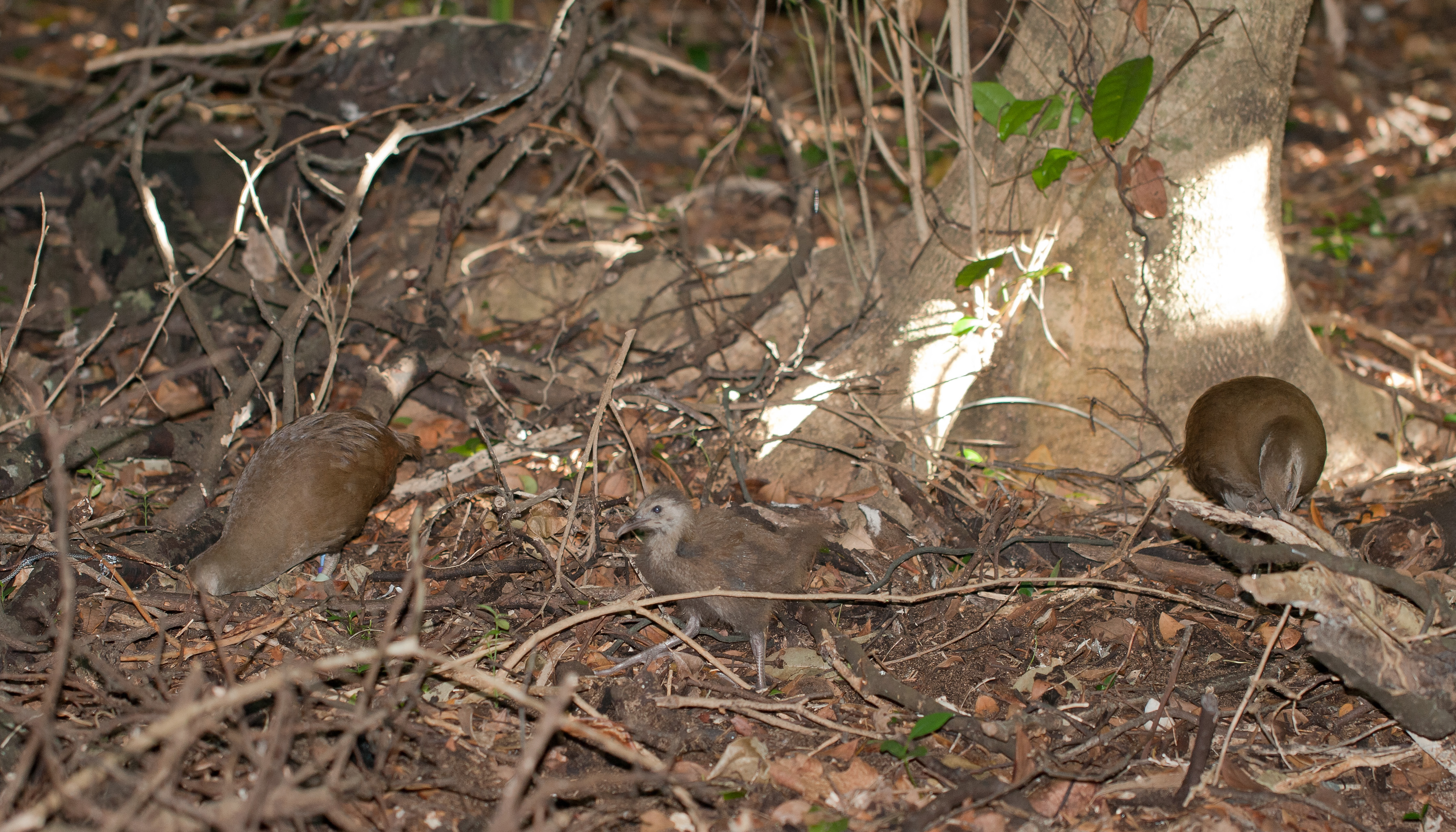
A pair of woodhens with a chick

The success of this two-part recovery programme allowed the Lord Howe woodhen population to increase ten-fold, from a low of 20 birds in the 1970s to around 200 in 1985. Rather than a sustained increase, however, this growth quickly plateaued, and between 1988 and 2019 the woodhen population remained small but stable. A study in 1997 estimated the island's carrying capacity at 220 woodhens.

The Lord Howe Island Rodent Eradication Project (REP) intended to eradicate the introduced ship rat and house mouse, and in the winter of 2019, after nearly two decades of research and planning, the A$10.5 million project culminated in the distribution of poison bait. Due to the risk of their ingesting poison, the entire wild woodhen population – along with the endangered Lord Howe currawong – was taken into captivity for the duration of the baiting program.

Although never intended as the primary beneficiaries of the REP, since its completion the woodhen population has grown exponentially. From the 208 birds released in 2019, the population grew to 598 in November 2021 and 778 in March 2022. As of the most recent survey in December 2024, the woodhen population numbers at least 1,638 birds.

Following success with the woodhen, there have been recovery efforts for other endemic species on Lord Howe Island, including the Lord Howe flax snail (Placostylus bivaricosus) and the Lord Howe currawong (Strepera graculina crissalis).

== Gilbert rail ==
A rail, known only from a single specimen in the form of an alcohol-preserved skin at Harvard, was originally believed to have been collected on one of the Gilbert Islands and named as the Gilbert rail, Gallirallus conditicius (Peters & Griscom, 1928).

However, the island attributed to this holotype is low, rocky and sandy, and has no habitat suitable for a rail.

It now appears that a curatorial error led to the specimen being labeled to the wrong collection, and the specimen is actually an immature female Lord Howe woodhen. It differs from that species only in a paler crown, throat and underparts, and browner head, but long immersion in alcohol could have changed the colour. The island to which the specimen was originally attributed is 4,500 km from Lord Howe Island, and it appears improbable that two flightless rails could evolve separately with no morphological differences.
