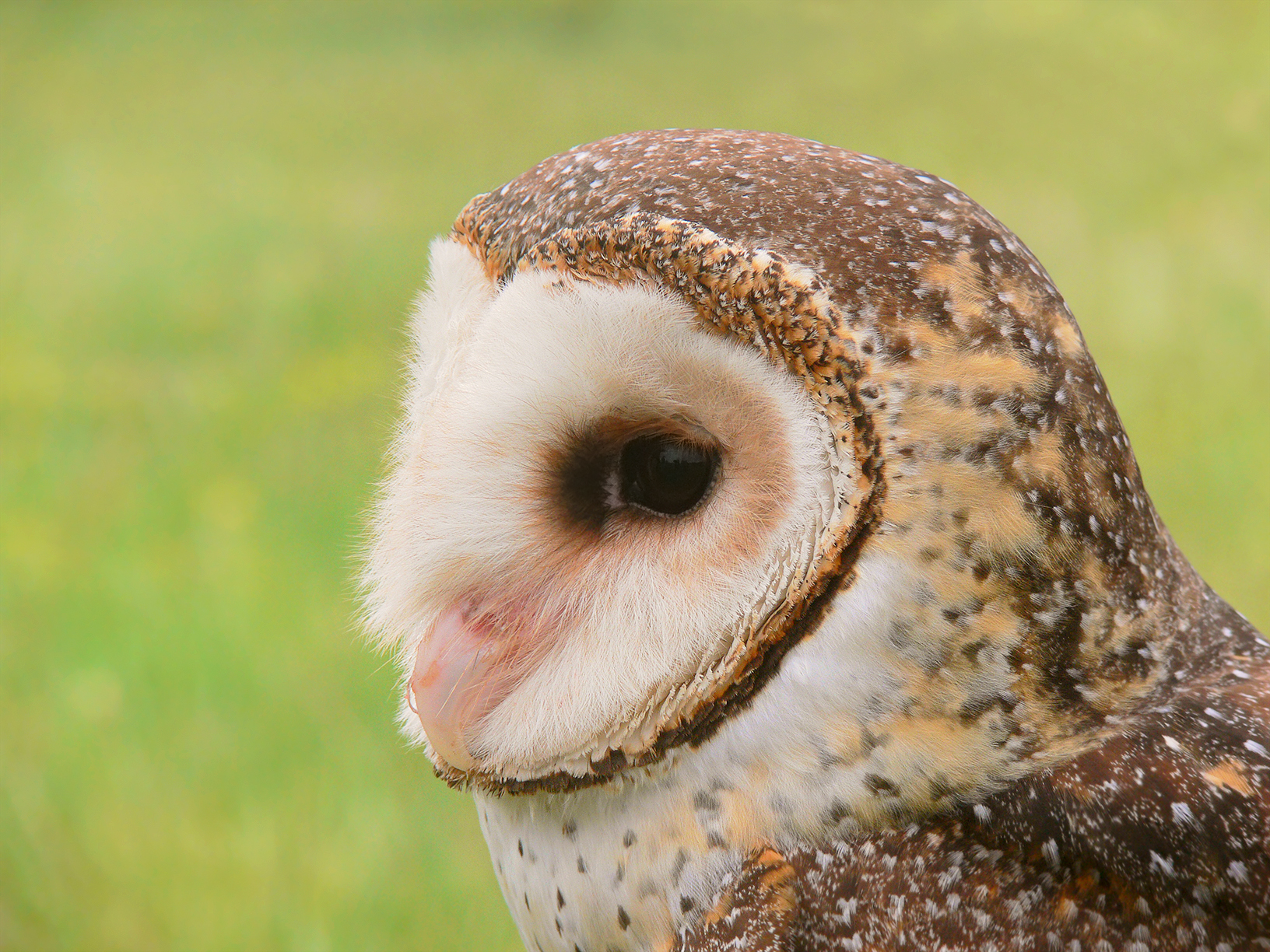
- T. n. novaehollandiae

Conservation status
- Least Concern (IUCN 3.1)
- CITES Appendix II

Scientific classification
- Kingdom: Animalia
- Phylum: Chordata
- Class: Aves
- Order: Strigiformes
- Family: Tytonidae
- Genus: Tyto
- Species: T. novaehollandiae

Binomial name
- Tyto novaehollandiae (Stephens, 1826)

Subspecies
- See text

= Australian masked owl =

Species of owl

The Australian masked owl (Tyto novaehollandiae), also the Australasian masked owl or simply the masked owl, especially in Australia, is a barn owl of Southern New Guinea and the non-desert areas of Australia.

== Taxonomy ==
Described subspecies of Tyto novaehollandiae include:

- T. n. almae (Jønsson et al., 2013) Seram masked owl (Seram Island)
- T. n. calabyi I.J. Mason, 1983, (southern New Guinea)
- T. n. castanops (Gould, 1837), Tasmanian masked owl (Tasmania and introduced to Lord Howe Island)
- T. n. galei Mathews, 1914, (Cape York Peninsula)
- T. n. manusi (Rothschild & Hartert, 1914) Manus masked owl (Manus Island)
- T. n. kimberli (Mathews, 1912), Northern masked owl (northern mainland Australia)
- T. n. melvillensis Mathews, 1912, (Tiwi Islands)
- T. n. novaehollandiae (Stephens, 1826), (southern mainland Australia)
- T. n. sororcula (Sclater, PL, 1883) Moluccan masked owl (south Moluccas)
- T. n. troughtoni N.W. Cayley, 1931, cave-nesting masked owl (Nullarbor Plain, validity doubtful)

== Description ==
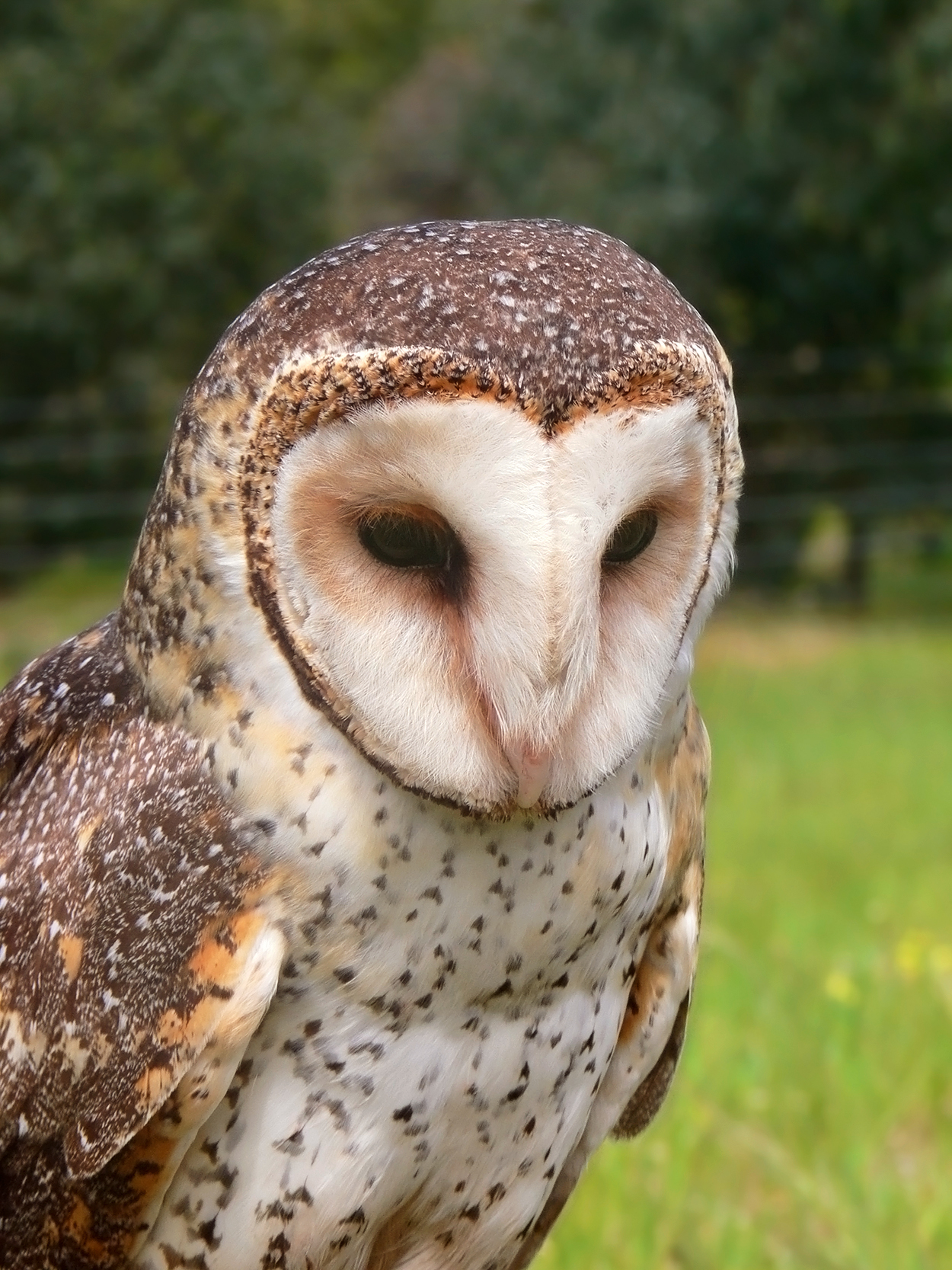
A Masked owl at a Traveling Raptor flight display in Australia

Brown feathers surround a white, heart-shaped mask. Their dorsal plumage is brown, aside from light gray spots on the upper back. Their front is white with brown spots. Their eye color varies from black to dark brown. The species have sexual dimorphism, females are darker shaded and larger than males. Male masked owls' weights ranges from 420 to 800 g (0.93 to 1.76 lb), while females are typically much larger ranging from 545 to 1,260 g (1.202 to 2.778 lb).

Length ranges between 330 to 410 mm (13 to 16 in) for males and 390 to 500 mm (15 to 20 in) for females. Wing span is up to 1,280 mm (50 in) for southern female masked owls. Masked owls follow the typical pattern of birds from the tropics being much smaller than birds from temperate regions. In this instance, Tasmanian masked owls are the largest of the entire barn-owl family. Among the species in the family, only the greater sooty owl is on average heavier than the Australian masked owl but the Tasmanian species is rather larger and heavier even than the greater sooty owl.

The mean weight of the nominate subspecies was found to be 476 g (1.049 lb) in males and 630 g (1.39 lb) in females while in Tasmania, mean weighs for males were 632 g (1.393 lb) and for females were 845 g (1.863 lb).

== Naming ==
Other common names have been used for this species in the past. For example:

- Mouse-Owl – This was a name given to the species by Latham in 1821. It is thought to be due to its habit of catching mice at homesteads.

== Habitat ==
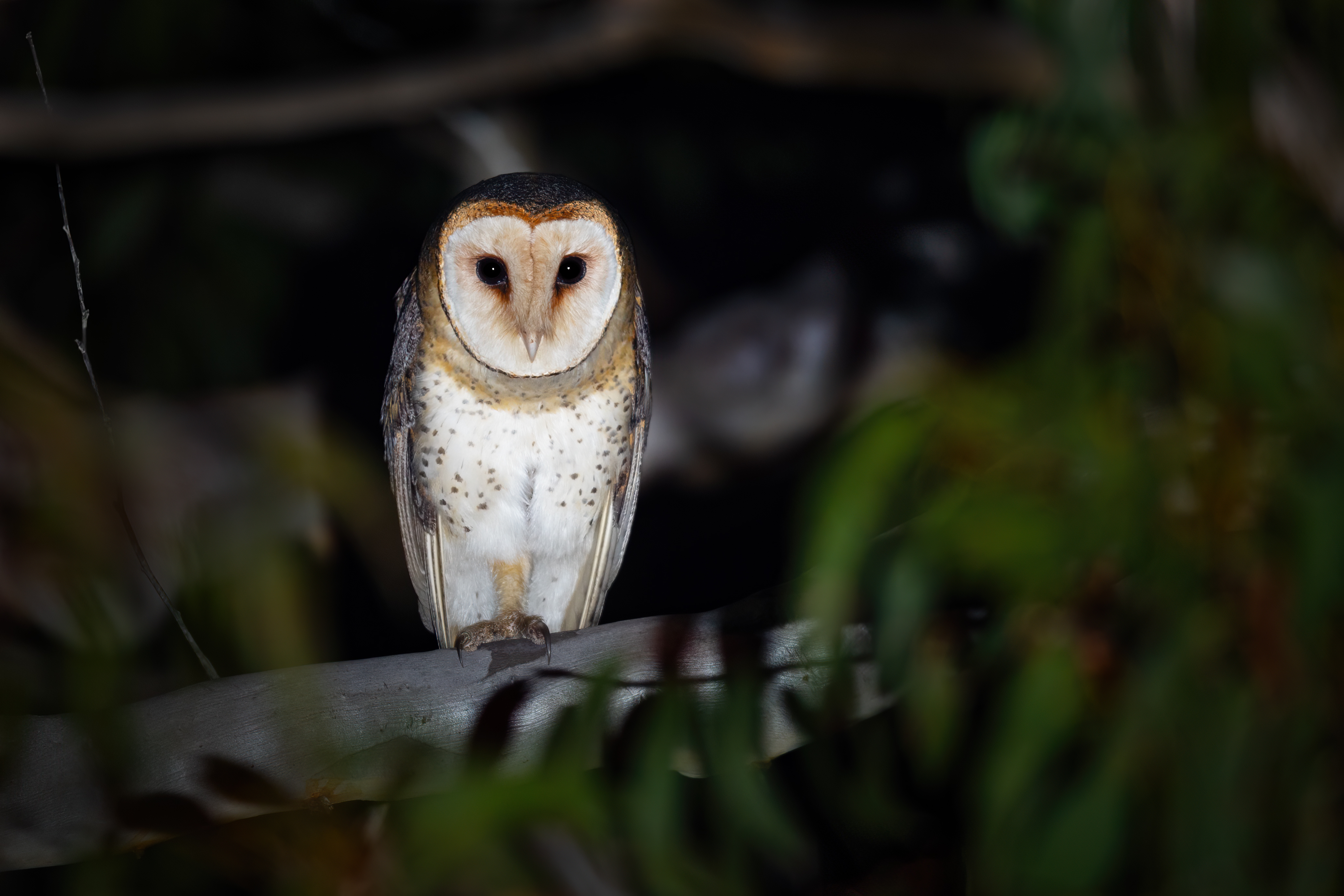
Australian Masked-Owl, Barrington Tops, NSW

The Australian masked owl inhabits timbered areas, often with a shrub understorey. In Australia they are seldom found more than 300 km inland. They roost and nest in large tree hollows near foraging areas. They are nocturnal and their prey includes rodents, small dasyurids, possums, bandicoots, rabbits, bats, birds, reptiles and insects. Foraging is primarily for terrestrial prey, however some prey is taken from the trees or in flight. The population of the Australian masked owl on the mainland is declining and several states have this owl on the Species Conservation Status list. They are territorial and may remain in the same area once they have established a breeding territory. A 2020 case study done using radio telemetry showed that the “home” range of these owls might be as large as 19–23 km^{2}, but this data remains ambiguous due to the small sample size.

The breeding population in Tasmania's Takayna rainforest is under threat from a proposal by the MMG Mining Company, 68% of which is owned by China's Minmetals conglomerate to dump acidic mineral waste by flooding the forest with a dam to hold its tailings. As of February 2024, the plan is awaiting ministerial approval by Australia's Environmental Minister Tanya Plibersek.

== Reproduction ==
They breed when conditions are favorable which can be any time of the year. The nest is usually built in hollow trees with soil, mulch or sand. Some populations are known to use caves or rock crevices for nesting and roosting.

The female lays two or three eggs and incubates them while the male hunts for food. The young are white or off white when they first develop feathers. They can leave the nest at two to three months of age but return to be fed by the parents for another month before going on their own.

== Conservation status ==
The population of the Australian masked owl on the mainland is declining and several states have placed this owl on the Species Conservation Status list.

In Victoria (Australia), the masked owl is a listed threatened bird, and an Action Statement has been prepared under the Flora and Fauna Guarantee Act 1988. In New South Wales, the masked owl is scheduled as Vulnerable under the Biodiversity Conservation Act (2016).
