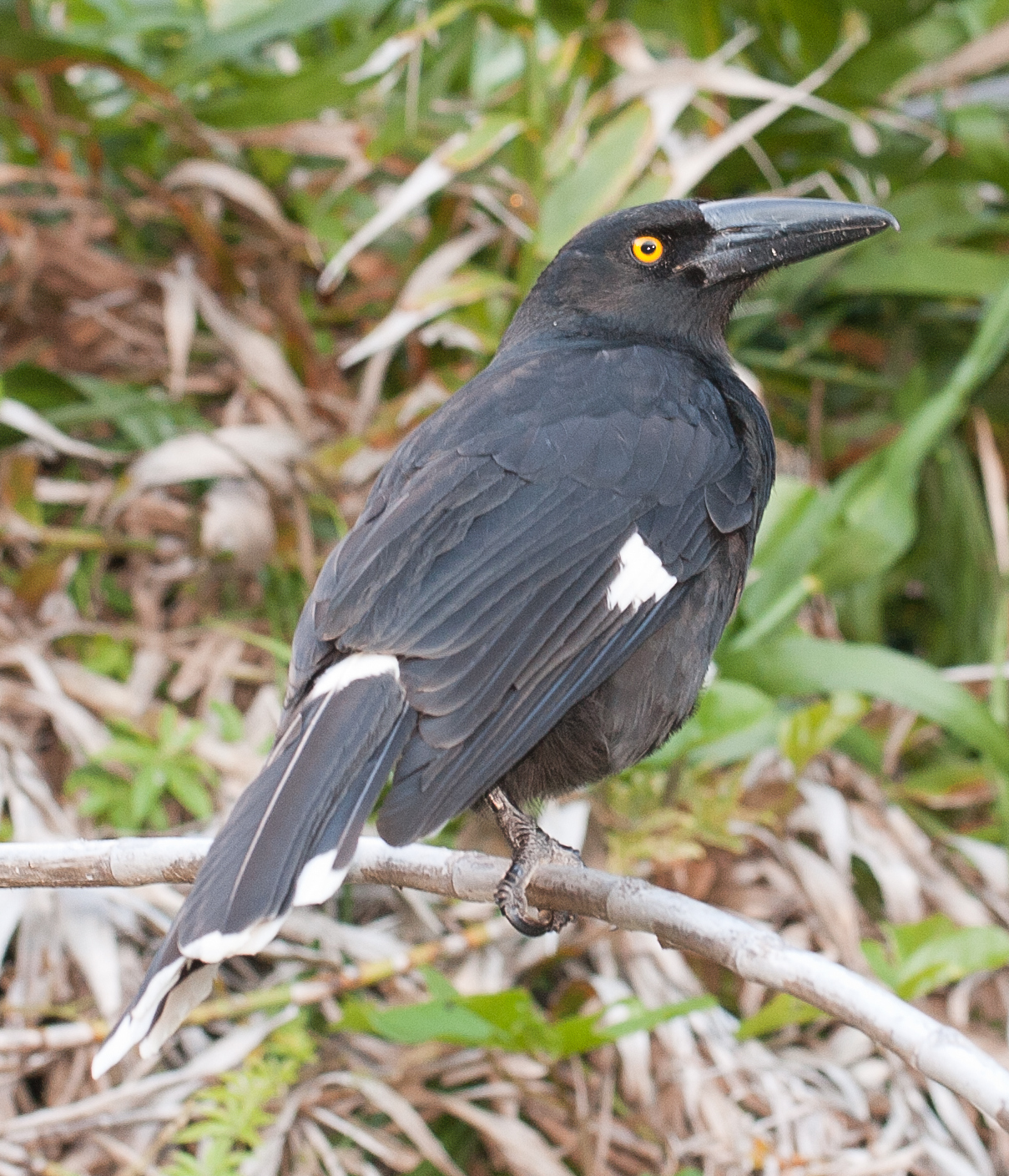

Conservation status
- Vulnerable (EPBC Act)

Scientific classification
- Kingdom: Animalia
- Phylum: Chordata
- Class: Aves
- Order: Passeriformes
- Family: Artamidae
- Subfamily: Cracticinae
- Genus: Strepera
- Species: S. graculina
- Subspecies: S. g. crissalis

Trinomial name
- Strepera graculina crissalis Sharpe, 1877

Synonyms
- Strepera crisalis

= Lord Howe currawong =

Subspecies of bird

The Lord Howe currawong (Strepera graculina crissalis), Lord Howe Island currawong or Lord Howe pied currawong, is a large and mainly black passerine bird in the family Artamidae. It is endemic to Lord Howe Island in the Tasman Sea, part of New South Wales, Australia, and is a threatened subspecies of the pied currawong.

== Description ==
The currawong is similar to the other subspecies of the pied currawong. It is generally a black bird with yellow eyes, white on the wing, undertail coverts, the base of the tail and tip of the tail. Compared with the nominate subspecies of eastern Australia it has a longer and more slender bill, less white on the wings and tail, and a paler iris.

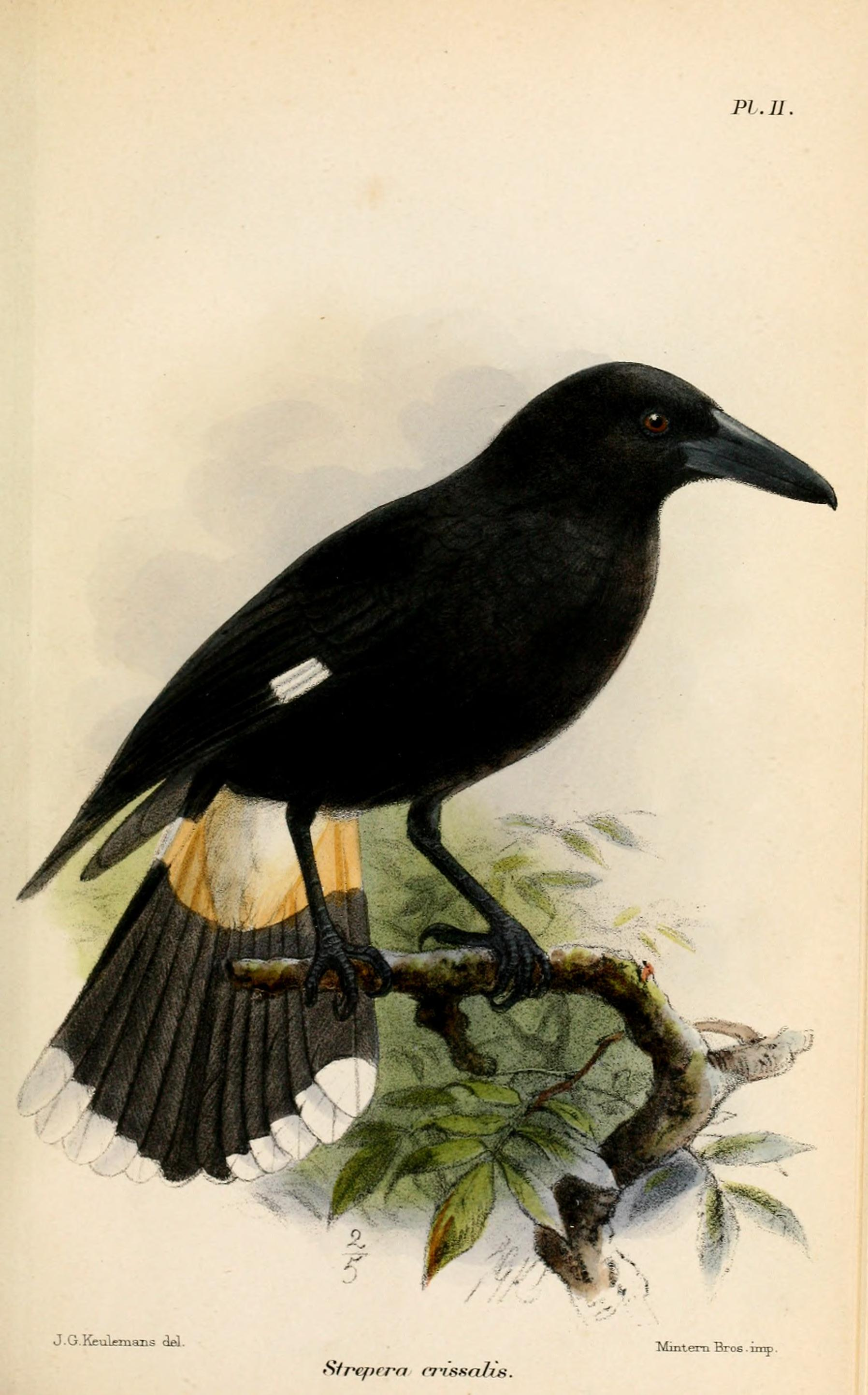
Illustration by Keulemans, 1877

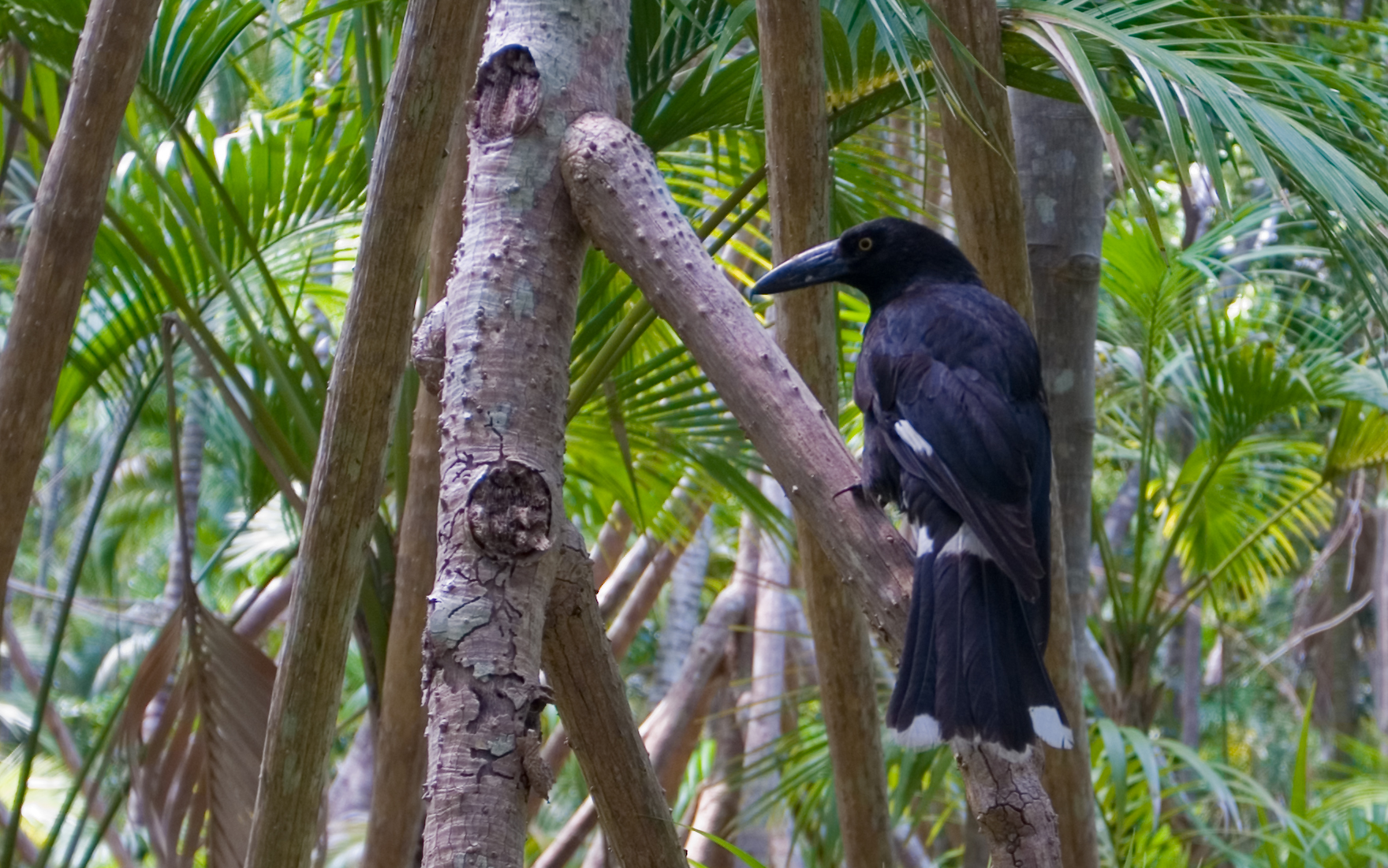
In the forest

== Distribution and habitat ==
The currawong is restricted to the Lord Howe Island group where it inhabits the main island's native subtropical rainforest and palm forest, especially along creeks and in gullies, as well as areas around human habitation.

== Behaviour ==
The Lord Howe currawong has a strong sense of curiosity, often following walkers on the island's tracks. They are aggressive during the breeding season and will swoop at walkers who approach their nests.

=== Feeding ===
The currawong is a predator and an omnivore. The birds forage widely throughout the island and offshore seabird colonies. They take small birds and the young of many birds, including domestic poultry, as well as seeds and fruits.

=== Breeding ===
The currawong breeds in territories in the forest that contain a section of gully or watercourse lined with tall timber. It has been estimated that the island is large enough to contain 35-40 territories. The bird builds a cup-shaped nest of sticks and twigs, lined with finer twigs, in the outer branches of a tree, in which it lays a clutch of three light brown eggs, marked with darker blotches. The incubation period is 21 days and the time from hatching to fledging about 30.

=== Voice ===
The currawong has a distinct loud and melodious call.

== Status and conservation ==
In 2000 the population was estimated to comprise about 80 mature breeding birds. The taxon is listed as Vulnerable under Australia's EPBC Act because of its small and restricted population and occasional persecution due to its predatory habits.
