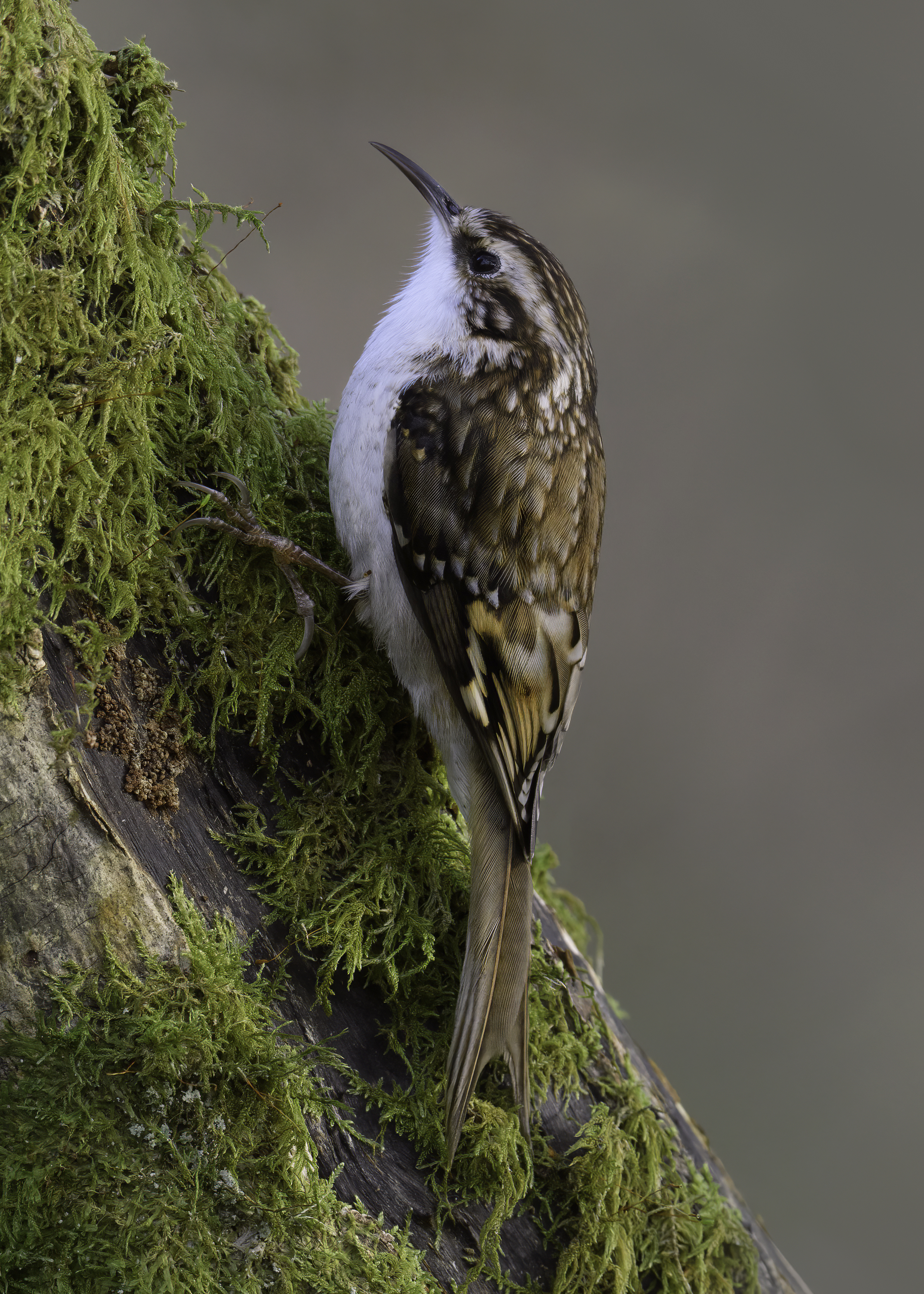
- In Dumfries and Galloway, Scotland
- Contact calls recorded in Surrey, England

Conservation status
- Least Concern (IUCN 3.1)

Scientific classification
- Kingdom: Animalia
- Phylum: Chordata
- Class: Aves
- Order: Passeriformes
- Family: Certhiidae
- Genus: Certhia
- Species: C. familiaris

Binomial name
- Certhia familiaris Linnaeus, 1758
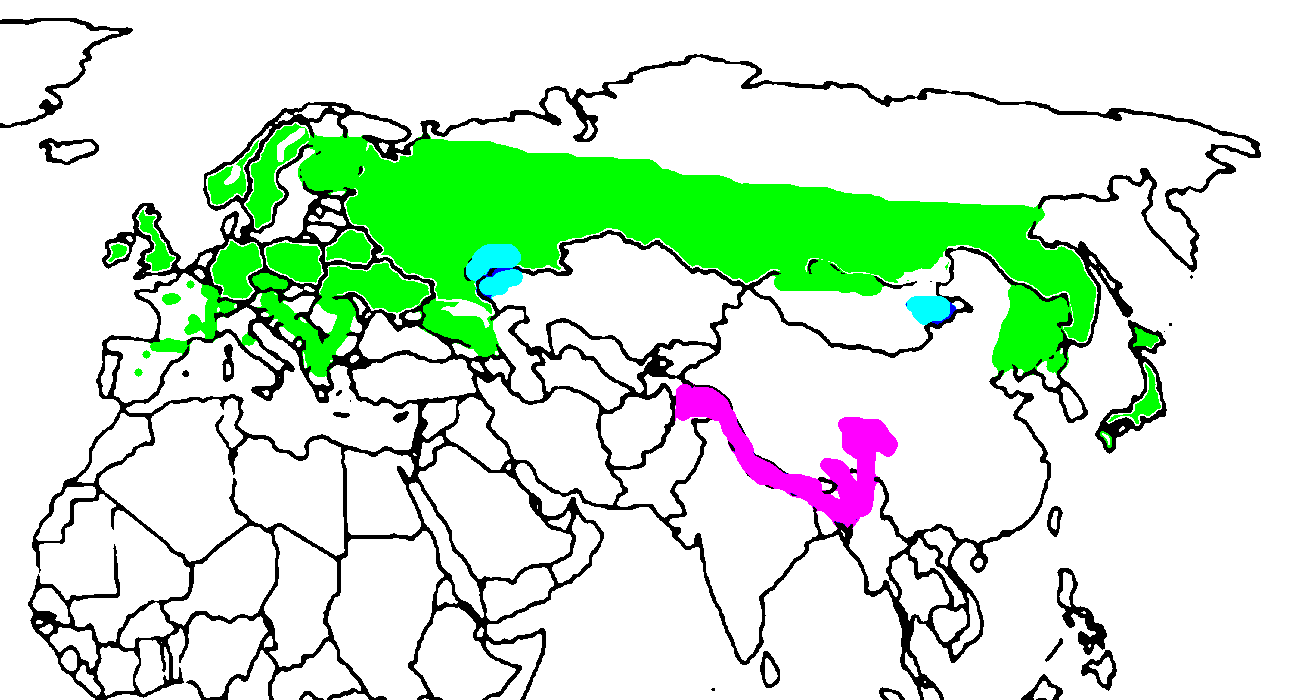
- Green – resident all year Blue – winter visitor only Magenta – subspecies now often split as Hodgson's treecreeper

= Eurasian treecreeper =

Small passerine bird found in temperate Eurasia

The Eurasian treecreeper or common treecreeper (Certhia familiaris) is a small passerine bird also known in the British Isles, where it is the only living member of its genus, simply as treecreeper. It is similar to other treecreepers, and has a curved bill, patterned brown upperparts, whitish underparts, and long stiff tail feathers which help it creep up tree trunks. It can be most easily distinguished from the similar short-toed treecreeper, which shares much of its European range, by its different song.

The Eurasian treecreeper has nine or more subspecies which breed in different parts of its range in the Palearctic. This species is found in woodlands of all kinds, but where it overlaps with the short-toed treecreeper in western Europe it is more likely to be found in coniferous forests or at higher altitudes. It nests in tree crevices or behind bark flakes, and favours introduced giant sequoia as nest sites where they are available. The female typically lays five or six pink-speckled white eggs in the lined nest, but eggs and chicks are vulnerable to attack by woodpeckers and mammals, including squirrels.

The Eurasian treecreeper is insectivorous and climbs up tree trunks like a mouse, to search for insects which it picks from crevices in the bark with its fine curved bill. It then flies to the base of another tree with a distinctive erratic flight. This bird is solitary in winter, but may form communal roosts in cold weather.

== Description ==
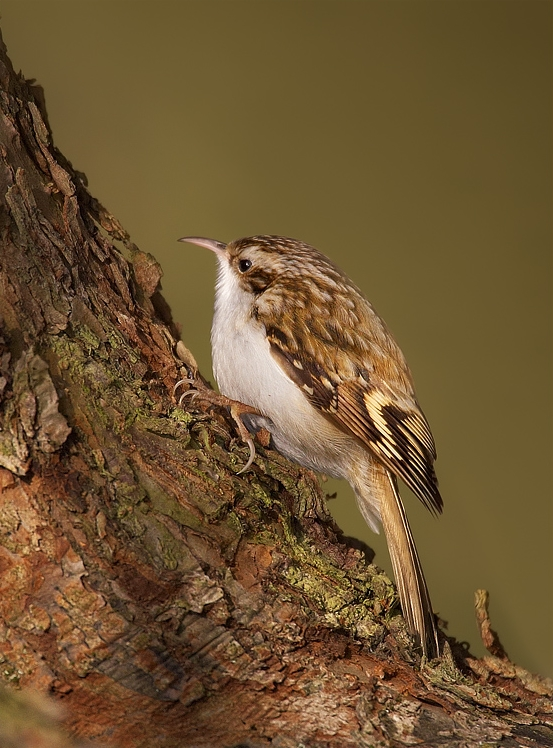
A Eurasian treecreeper climbing up a tree, leaning on its tail

Similar in appearance, all treecreepers are small birds with streaked and spotted brown upperparts, rufous rumps and whitish underparts. They have long decurved bills, and long rigid tail feathers that provide support as they creep up tree trunks looking for insects.

The Eurasian treecreeper is 12.5 cm (4.9 in) long and weighs 7.0–12.9 g (0.25–0.46 oz). It has warm brown upperparts intricately patterned with black, buff and white, and a plain brown tail. Its belly, flanks and vent area are tinged with buff. The sexes are similar, but the juvenile has duller upperparts than the adult, and its underparts are dull white with dark fine spotting on the flanks.

The contact call is a very quiet, thin and high-pitched sit, but the most distinctive call is a penetrating tsree, with a vibrato quality, sometimes repeated as a series of notes. The male's song begins with srrih, srrih followed in turn by a few twittering notes, a longer descending ripple, and a whistle that falls and then rises.

The range of the Eurasian treecreeper overlaps with that of several other treecreepers, which can present local identification problems. In Europe, the Eurasian treecreeper shares much of its range with the short-toed treecreeper. Compared to that species, it is whiter below, warmer and more spotted above, and has a whiter supercilium and slightly shorter bill. Visual identification, even in the hand, may be impossible for poorly marked birds. A singing treecreeper is usually identifiable, since short-toed treecreeper has a distinctive series of evenly spaced notes sounding quite different from the song of Eurasian treecreeper; however, both species have been known to sing the other's song.

Three Himalayan subspecies of Eurasian treecreeper are now sometimes given full species status as Hodgson's treecreeper, for example by BirdLife International, but if they are retained as subspecies of Eurasian, they have to be distinguished from three other South Asian treecreepers. The plain tail of the Eurasian treecreeper differentiates it from the bar-tailed treecreeper, which has a distinctive barred tail pattern, and its white throat is an obvious difference from that of the brown-throated treecreeper. The rusty-flanked treecreeper is more difficult to separate from the Eurasian, but the former has more contrasting cinnamon, rather than buff, flanks.

The North American brown creeper has never been recorded in Europe, but an autumn vagrant would be difficult to identify, since it would not be singing, and the American species' call is much like that of Eurasian treecreeper. In appearance, the brown creeper is more like a short-toed treecreeper than a Eurasian one, but a vagrant might still not be possible to identify with certainty given the similarities between the three species.

== Taxonomy ==
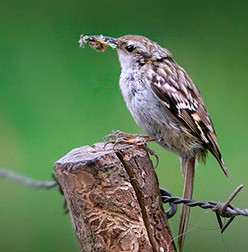
Short-toed treecreeper, a confusion species in Europe

The Eurasian treecreeper was first described under its current scientific name in 1758 by the Swedish naturalist Carl Linnaeus in the tenth edition of his Systema Naturae. The binomial name is derived from Ancient Greek kerthios, a small tree-dwelling bird described by Aristotle and others, and Latin familiaris, familiar or common.

This species is one of a group of very similar typical treecreeper species, all placed in the single genus Certhia. Eight species are currently recognised, in two evolutionary lineages: a Holarctic radiation, and a southern Asian group. The Holarctic group has a more warbling song, always (except in C. familiaris from China) starting or ending with a shrill sreeh. Species in the southern group, in contrast, have a faster-paced trill without the sreeh sound. All the species have distinctive vocalizations and some subspecies have been elevated to species on the basis of their calls.

The Eurasian treecreeper belongs to the northern group, along with the North American brown creeper, C. americana, the short-toed treecreeper, C. brachydactyla, of western Eurasia, and, if it is considered a separate species, Hodgson's treecreeper, C. hodgsoni, from the southern rim of the Himalayas.

The brown creeper has sometimes been considered to be a subspecies of Eurasian treecreeper, but has closer affinities to short-toed treecreeper, and is normally now treated as a full species. Hodgson's treecreeper is a more recent proposed split following studies of its cytochrome b mtDNA sequence and song structure that indicate that it may well be a distinct species from C. familiaris.

There are nine to twelve subspecies of Eurasian treecreeper, depending on the taxonomic view taken, which are all very similar and often interbreed in areas where their ranges overlap. There is a general cline in appearance from west to east across Eurasia, with subspecies becoming greyer above and whiter below, but this trend reverses east of the Amur River. The currently recognised subspecies are as follows:

Subspecies	Range	Notes
C. f. britannica	Great Britain and Ireland	Irish treecreepers, slightly darker than British ones, have sometimes been given subspecific status
C. f. macrodactyla	Western Europe	Paler above and whiter below than C. f. britannica
C. f. corsa	Corsica	Buff-tinged underparts and more contrasted upperparts than C. f. macrodactyla
C. f. familiaris	Scandinavia and eastern Europe east to western Siberia	Nominate subspecies. Paler above than C. f. macrodactyla, white underparts
C. f. daurica	Eastern Siberia, northern Mongolia	Paler and greyer than the nominate subspecies
C. f. orientalis	Amur basin, northeast China, Korea and Hokkaido, Japan	Similar to nominate, but with stronger streaking above
C. f. japonica	Japan south of Hokkaido	Darker and more rufous than C. f. daurica
C. f. persica	The Crimea and Turkey east to northern Iran	Duller and less rufous than the nominate form
C. f. tianchanica	Northwestern China and adjacent regions of the former USSR	Paler and more rufous than nominate subspecies
C. f. hodgsoni	Western Himalayas of, Kashmir	Often treated as a full species, Hodgson's treecreeper, C. hodgsonii.
C. f. mandellii	Eastern Himalayas of India, Nepal	Often now treated as a subspecies of Hodgson's treecreeper
C. f. khamensis	China, Sichuan	Often now treated as a subspecies of Hodgson's treecreeper

== Distribution and habitat ==
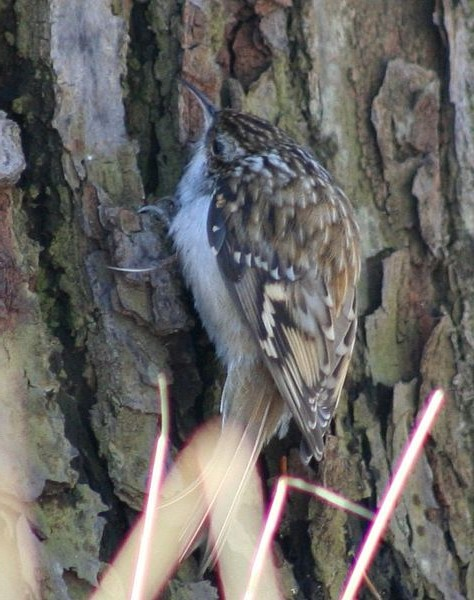
Central European bird feeding on a trunk

The Eurasian treecreeper is the most widespread member of its genus, breeding in temperate woodlands across the Palearctic from Ireland to Japan. It prefers mature trees, and in most of Europe, where it shares its range with short-toed treecreeper, it tends to be found mainly in coniferous forest, especially spruce and fir. However, where it is the only treecreeper, as in European Russia, or the British Isles, it frequents broadleaved or mixed woodland in preference to conifers. It is also found in parks and large gardens.

The Eurasian treecreeper breeds down to sea level in the north of its range, but tends to be a highland species further south. In the Pyrenees it breeds above 1,370 metres (4,490 feet), in China from 400–2,100 metres (1,300–6,900 ft) and in southern Japan from 1,065–2,135 metres (3,494–7,005 ft). The breeding areas have July isotherms between 14–16 °C and 23–24 °C (73–75 °F) and 72–73 °F).

The Eurasian treecreeper is non-migratory in the milder west and south of its breeding range, but some northern birds move south in winter, and individuals breeding on mountains may descend to a lower altitude in winter. Winter movements and post-breeding dispersal may lead to vagrancy outside the normal range. Wintering migrants of the Asian subspecies have been recorded in South Korea and China, and the nominate form has been recorded west of its breeding range as far as Orkney, Scotland. The Eurasian treecreeper has also occurred as a vagrant to the Channel Islands (where the short-toed is the resident species), Mallorca and the Faroe Islands.

== Ecology and behaviour ==
=== Breeding ===
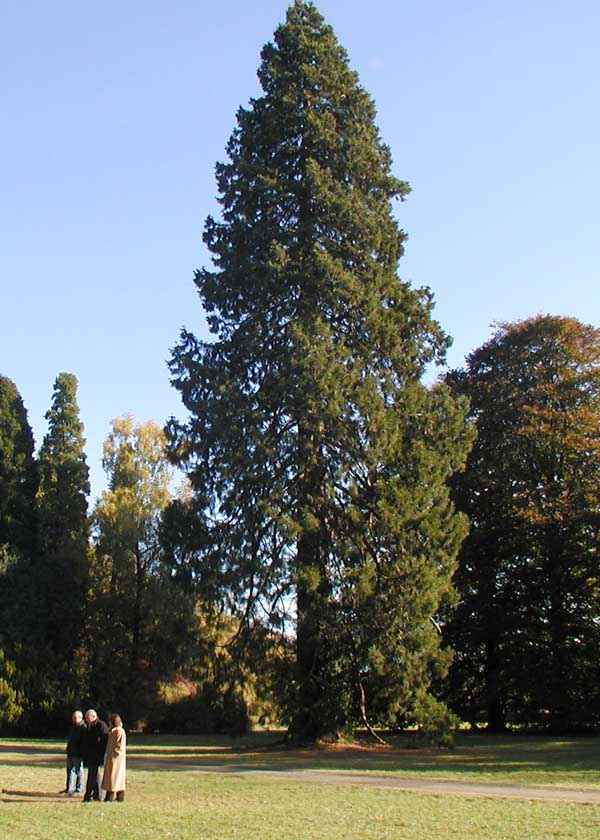
Introduced redwoods are the preferred nesting trees where present.

The Eurasian treecreeper breeds from the age of one year, nesting in tree crevices or behind bark flakes. Where present, the introduced North American giant sequoia is a favourite nesting tree, since a nest cavity can be easily hollowed out in its soft bark. Crevices in buildings or walls are sometimes used, and artificial nest boxes or flaps may be preferred in coniferous woodland. The nest has a base of twigs, pine needles, grass or bark, and a lining of finer material such as feathers, wool, moss, lichen or spider web.

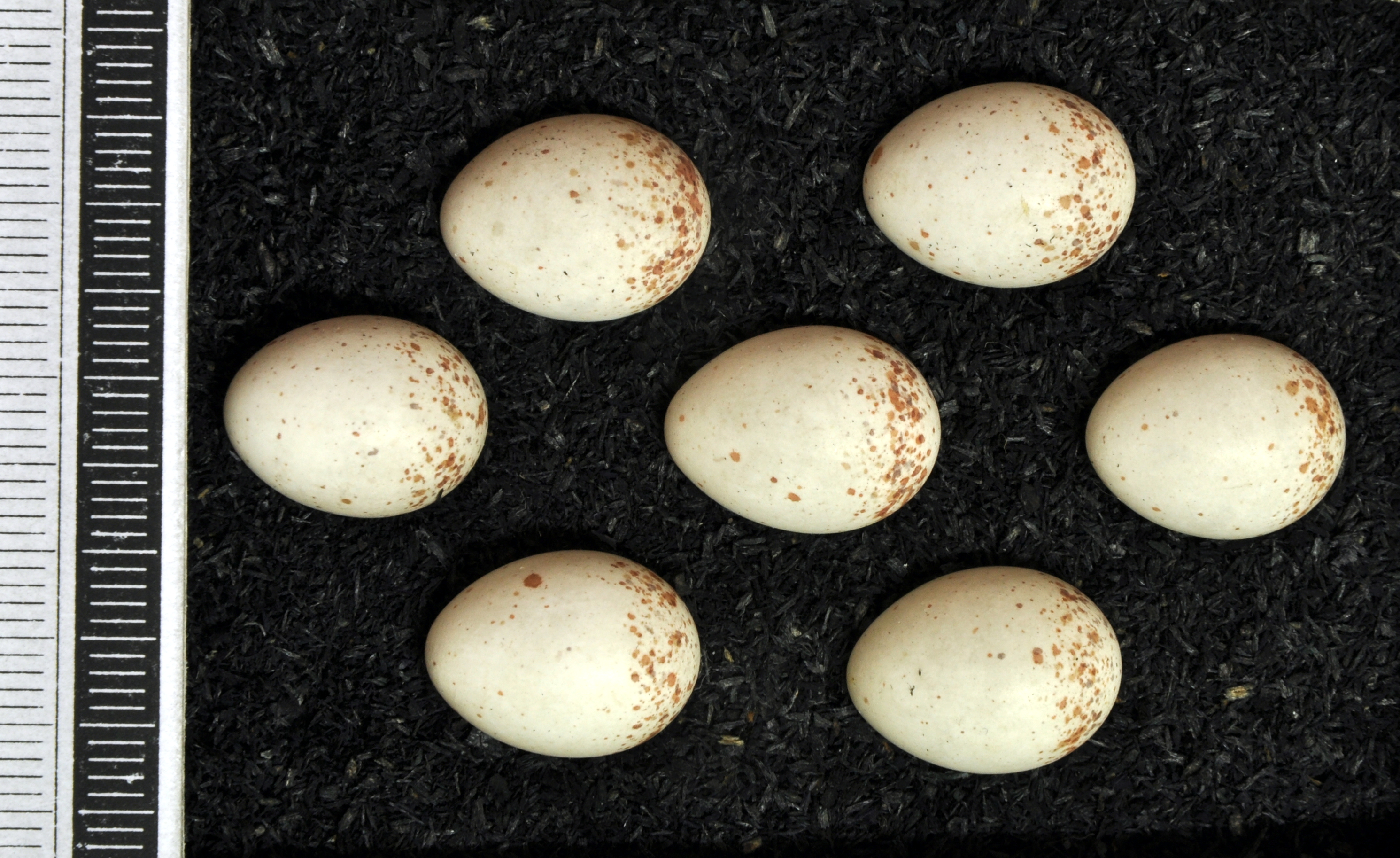
Eggs, Collection Museum Wiesbaden

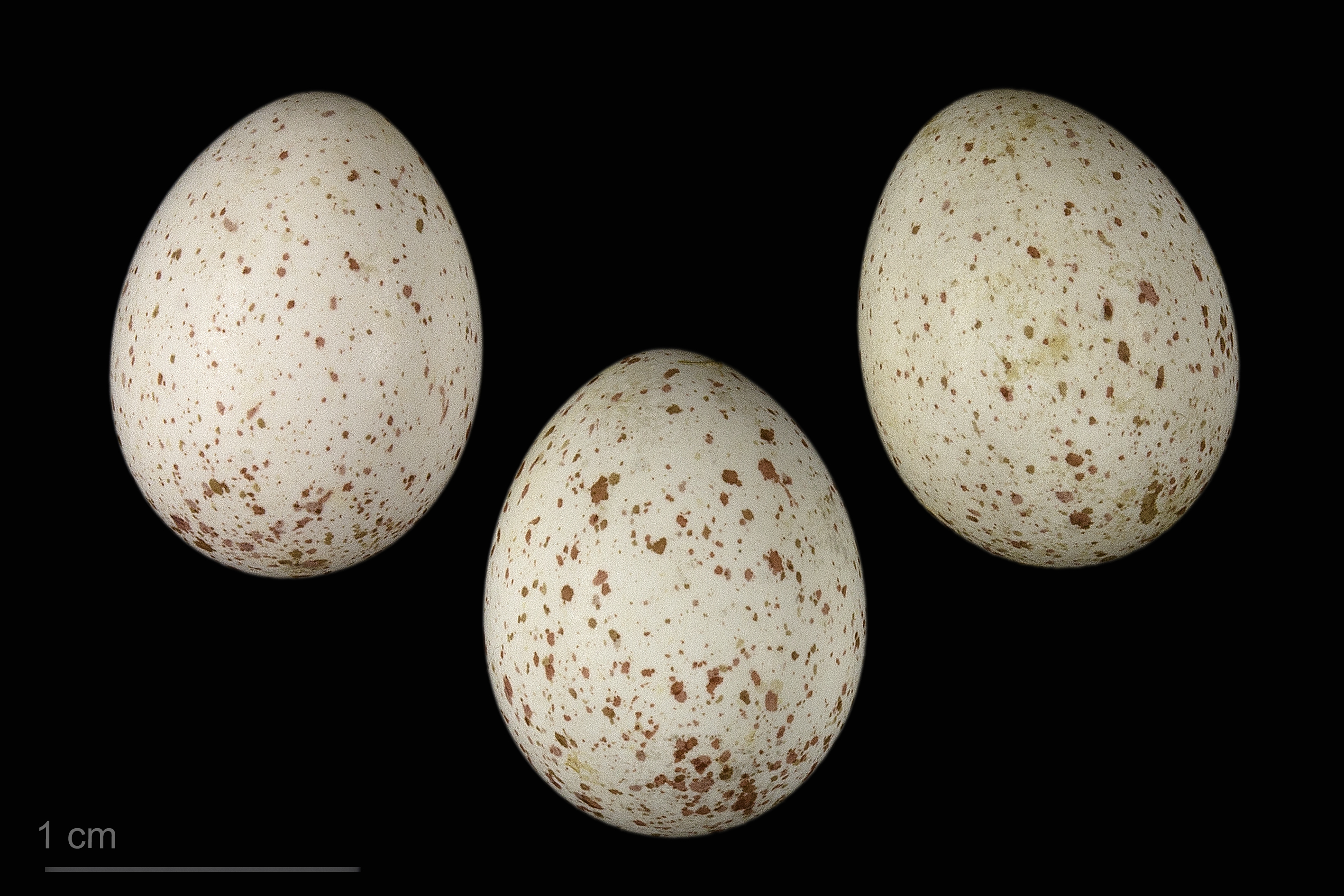
Certhia familiaris familiaris - MHNT

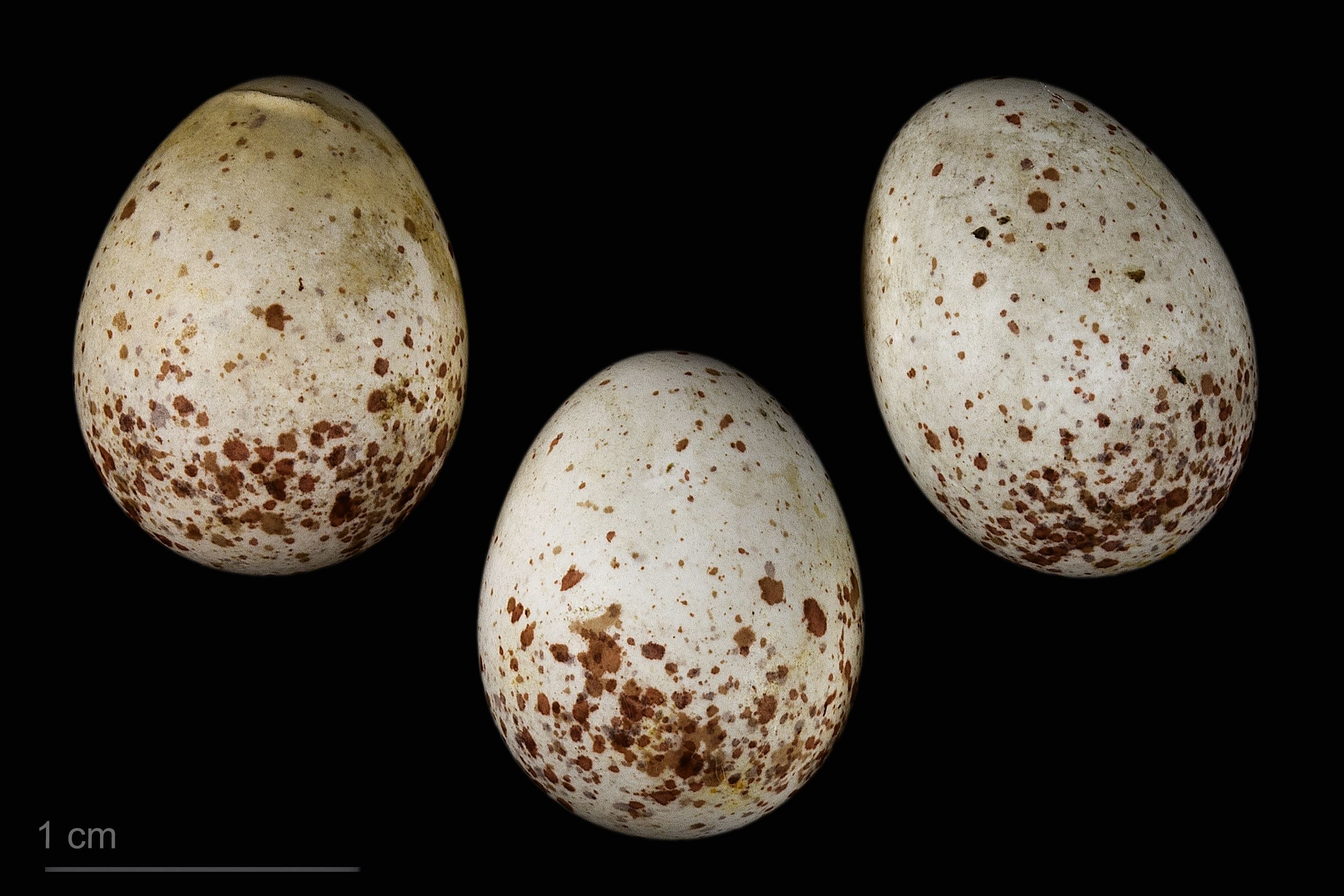
Certhia familiaris brittanica - MHNT

In Europe, the typical clutch of five–six eggs is laid between March and June, but in Japan three–five eggs are laid from May to July. The eggs are white with very fine pinkish speckles mainly at the broad end, measure 16 mm × 12 mm (0.63 in × 0.47 in) and weigh 1.2 g (0.042 oz) of which 6% is shell. The eggs are incubated by the female alone for 13–17 days until the altricial downy chicks hatch; they are then fed by both parents, but brooded by the female alone, for a further 15–17 days to fledging. Juveniles return to the nest for a few nights after fledging. About 20% of pairs, mainly in the south and west, raise a second brood.

Predators of treecreeper nests and young include the great spotted woodpecker, red squirrel, and small mustelids, and predation is about three times higher in fragmented landscapes than in solid blocks of woodland (32.4% against 12.0% in less fragmented woodlands). The predation rate increases with the amount of forest edge close to a nest site, and also the presence of nearby agricultural land, in both cases probably because of a higher degree of mustelid predation. This species is parasitised in the nest by the moorhen flea, Dasypsyllus gallinulae. The juvenile survival rate of this species is unknown, but 47.7% of adults survive each year. The typical lifespan is two years, but the maximum recorded age is eight years and ten months.

=== Feeding ===
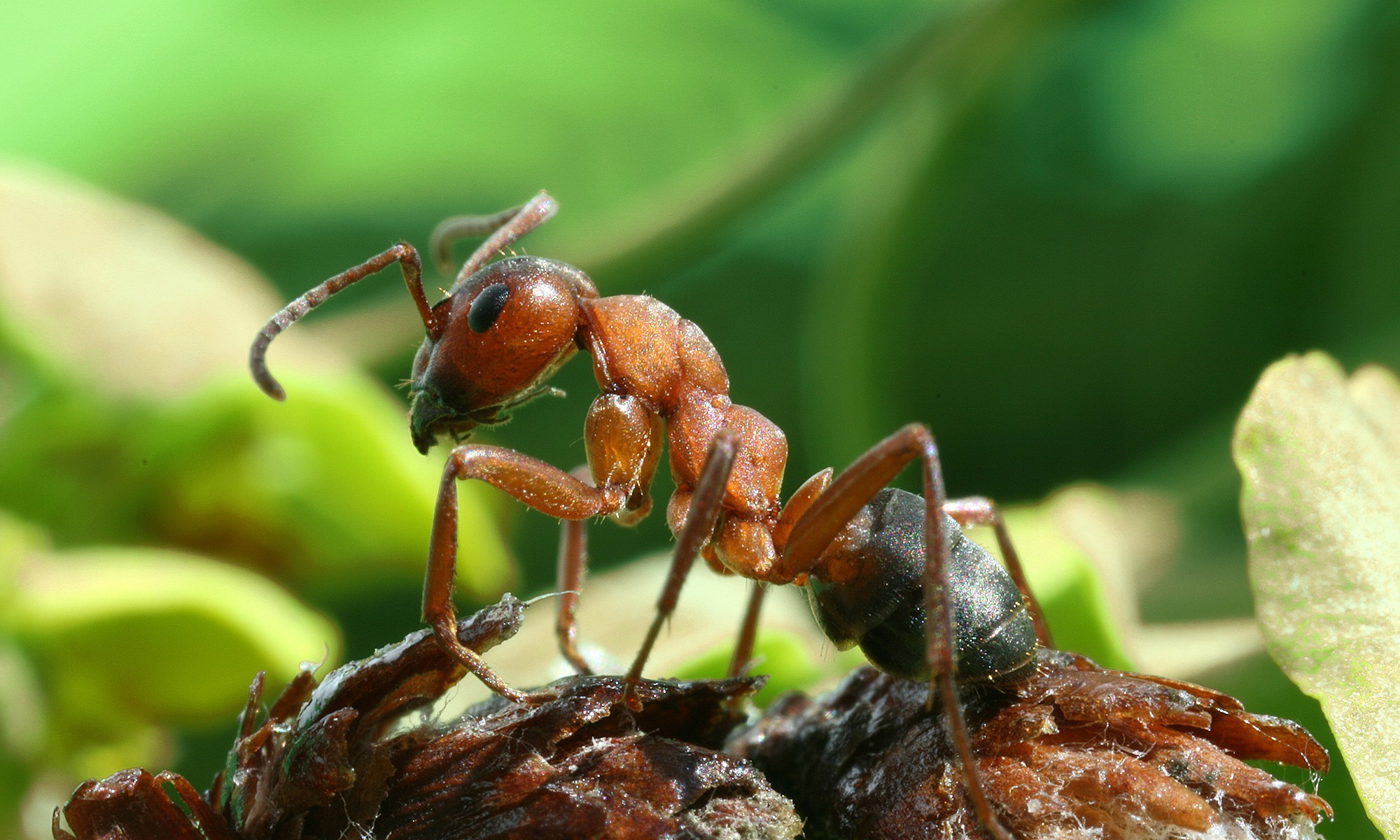
Formica rufa, a competitor for arthropod prey

The Eurasian treecreeper typically seeks invertebrate food on tree trunks, starting near the tree base and working its way up using its stiff tail feathers for support. Unlike a nuthatch, it does not come down trees head first, but flies to the base of another nearby tree. It uses its long thin bill to extract insects and spiders from crevices in the bark. Although normally found on trees, it will occasionally hunt prey items on walls, bare ground, or amongst fallen pine needles, and may add some conifer seeds to its diet in the colder months.

The female Eurasian treecreeper forages primarily on the upper parts of the tree trunks, while the male uses the lower parts. A study in Finland found that if a male disappears, the unpaired female will forage at lower heights, spend less time on each tree and have shorter foraging bouts than a paired female.

This bird may sometimes join mixed-species feeding flocks in winter, but it does not appear to share the resources found by accompanying tits and goldcrests, and may just be benefiting from the extra vigilance of a flock. Wood ants share the same habitat as the treecreeper, and also feed on invertebrates on tree trunks. The Finnish researchers found that where the ants have been foraging, there are fewer arthropods, and male treecreepers spent a shorter time on spruce trunks visited by ants.

=== Habits ===
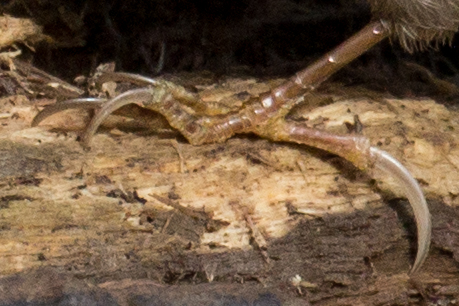
The claws of the treecreeper allows it to attach to the trunks and branches.

As a small woodland bird with cryptic plumage and a quiet call, the Eurasian treecreeper is easily overlooked as it hops mouse-like up a vertical trunk, progressing in short hops, using its stiff tail and widely splayed feet as support. Nevertheless, it is not wary, and is largely indifferent to the presence of humans. It has a distinctive erratic and undulating flight, alternating fluttering butterfly-like wing beats with side-slips and tumbles. Migrating birds may fly by day or night, but the extent of movements is usually masked by resident populations. It is solitary in winter, but in cold weather up to a dozen or more birds will roost together in a suitable sheltered crevice.

== Conservation status ==
This species has an extensive range of about 10 million km^{2} (3.8 million square miles). It has a large population, including an estimated 11–20 million individuals in Europe alone. Population trends have not been quantified, but the species is not believed to approach the thresholds for the population decline criterion of the IUCN Red List (declining more than 30% in ten years or three generations). For these reasons, the species is evaluated as Least Concern.

It is common through much of its range, but in the northernmost areas it is rare, since it is vulnerable to hard winters, especially if its feeding is disrupted by an ice glaze on the trees or freezing rain. It is also uncommon in Turkey and the Caucasus. In the west of its range it has spread to the Outer Hebrides in Scotland, pushed further north in Norway, and first bred in the Netherlands in 1993.
