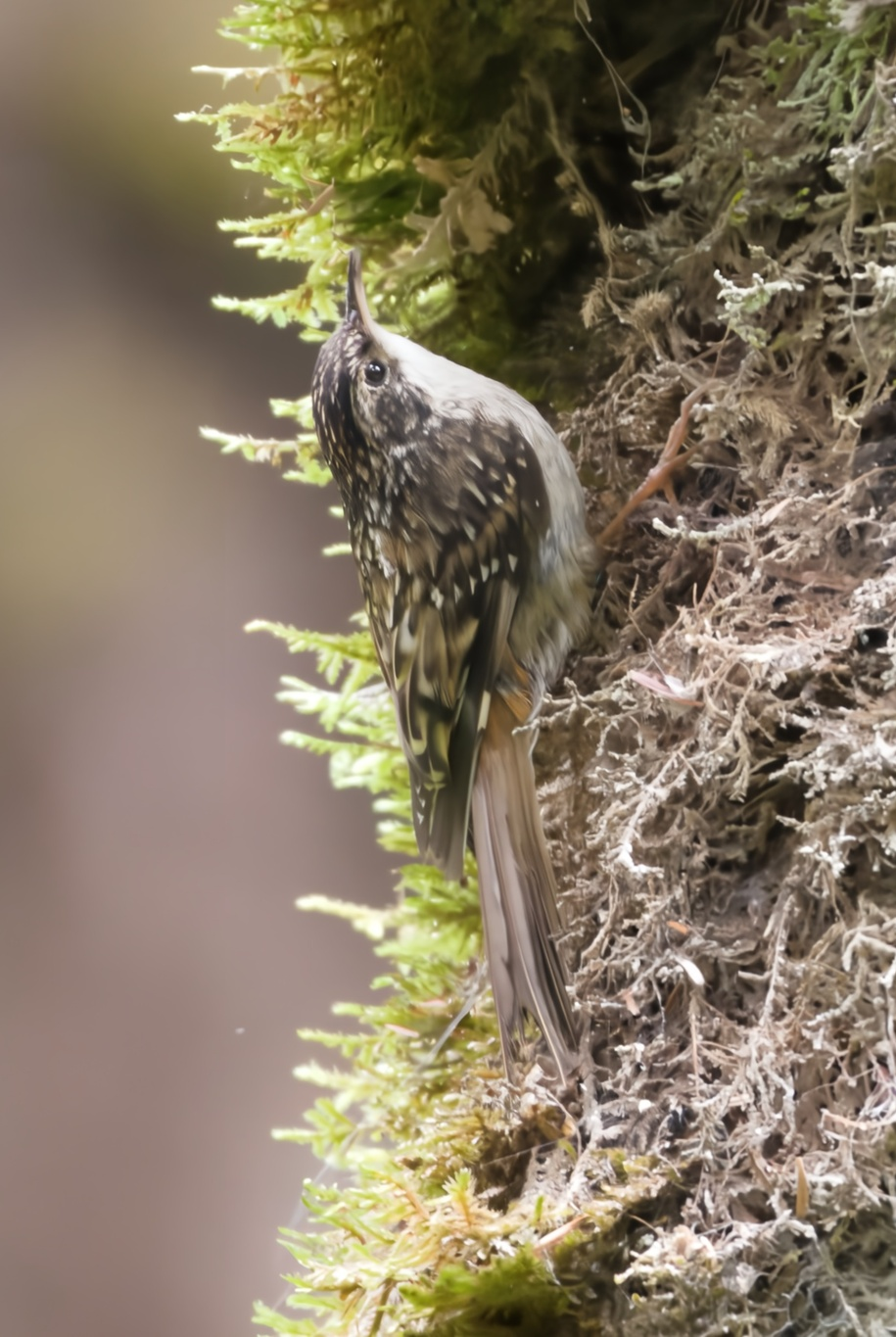

Conservation status
- Least Concern (IUCN 3.1)

Scientific classification
- Kingdom: Animalia
- Phylum: Chordata
- Class: Aves
- Order: Passeriformes
- Family: Certhiidae
- Genus: Certhia
- Species: C. tianquanensis

Binomial name
- Certhia tianquanensis Li G, 1995

Synonyms
- Certhia familiaris tianquanensis Li, 1995

= Sichuan treecreeper =

Species of bird

The Sichuan treecreeper (Certhia tianquanensis) is a rare species of bird in the treecreeper family, Certhiidae.

It was described as new to science (initially as a subspecies of the common treecreeper C. familiaris) in 1995 from 14 specimens taken at four sites in the mountains of western Sichuan, China. In 2002, it was realized that these birds constituted a distinct species, and subsequent research suggests it is closest to the Nepal treecreeper (C. nipalensis).

This bird is relatively large with a long tail. Its bill is strikingly short while the throat is whitish and darker underparts. Sichuan treecreeper sings aloud with a rapid and high-pitched trill.

This species is believed to be a relict species breeding in open old-growth stands of the conifer Faber's fir (Abies fabri) at high altitude (2,500–2,830 m or 8,200–9,280 ft), although it is thought to undertake localized altitudinal migrations in the winter (occurring down to at least 1,600 m or 5,200 ft).

It is known from five sites: Labahe Natural Reserve (Tianquin County), Dayi County, Shuanghe town (Ebian County), Wawu Shan (Hongya County), and Wujipung in Wolong Biosphere Reserve. Within this small area, the species is thought to be patchily distributed because it seems to be confined to old stands of the Faber's fir.

The species forages for invertebrates in the upper story of large trees by creeping along branches and trunks.

Intensive logging of primary coniferous forests in the last century, even at high altitudes in the mountains of western China, has seriously reduced the potential range of this species. The Wawu Shan table mountain has steep slopes which are inaccessible to lumberjacks in the absence of extensive road construction, but it is not yet formally protected, and there are plans to open up the regions for tourism by building a cable railway.

The population was estimated at less than 1000 adult individuals, occurring over a range of 19,690 km^{2} (7,600 sq mi). Formerly classified as vulnerable species by the IUCN, new research has shown it to be not as rare as it was believed. Consequently, it is downlisted to near threatened status in 2008.
