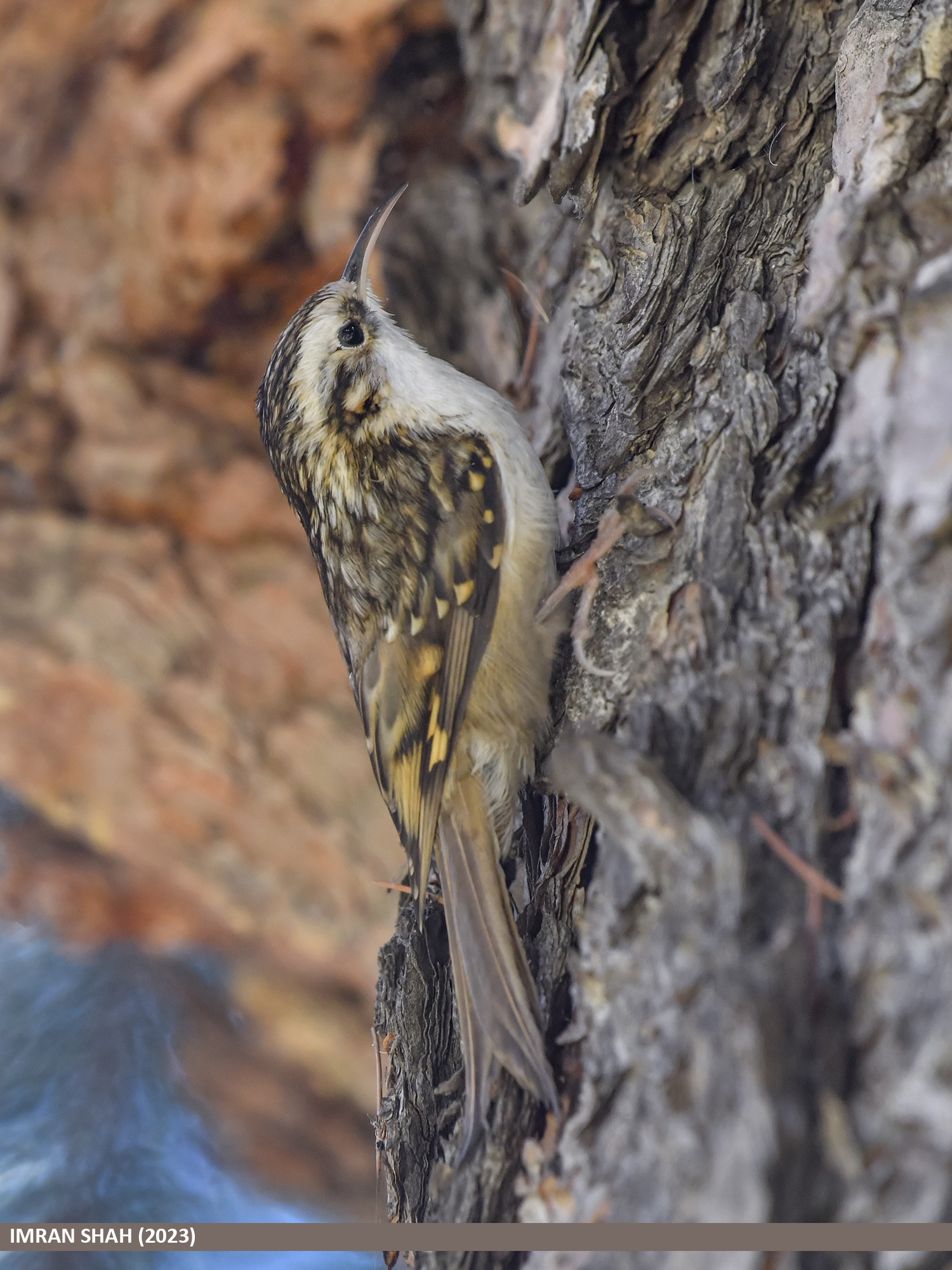
- Presumably nominate subspecies C. h. hodgsoni Naltar Valley (Gilgit-Baltistan, Pakistan)

Conservation status
- Least Concern (IUCN 3.1)

Scientific classification
- Kingdom: Animalia
- Phylum: Chordata
- Class: Aves
- Order: Passeriformes
- Family: Certhiidae
- Genus: Certhia
- Species: C. hodgsoni

Binomial name
- Certhia hodgsoni Brooks, 1871
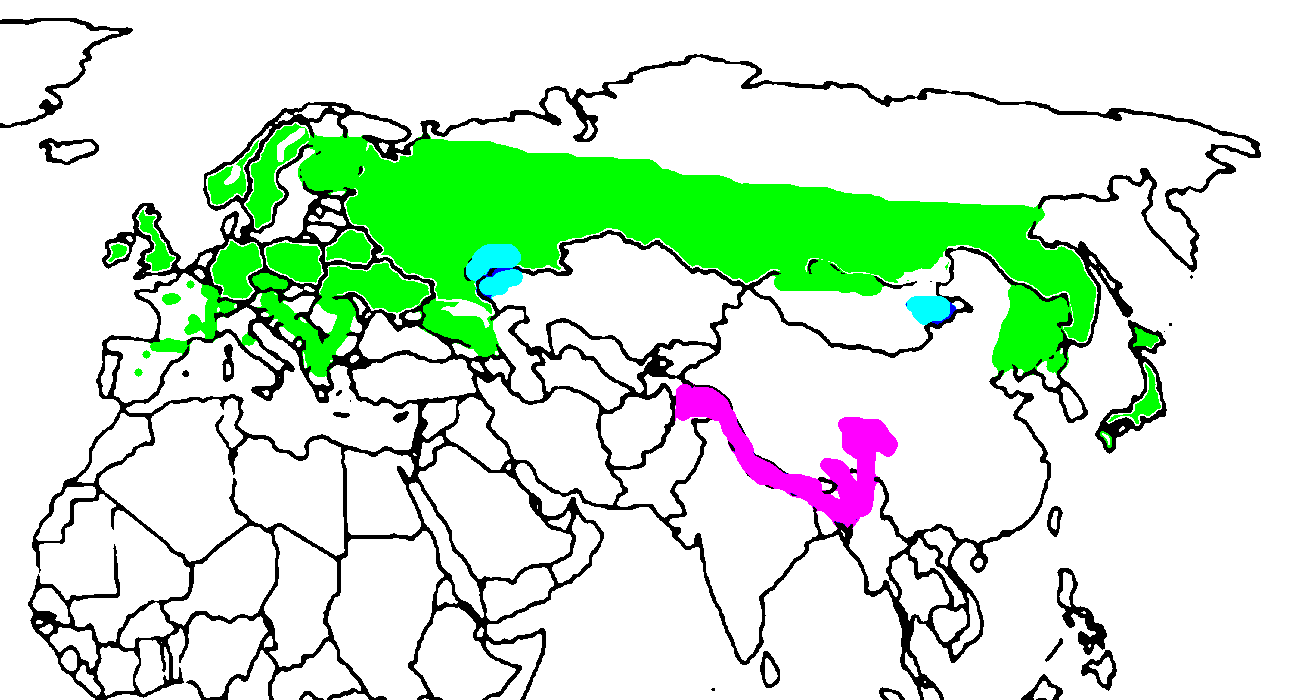
- Range in pink Common treecreeper range in light green

Synonyms
- Certhia familiaris hodgsoni Brooks, 1871; Certhia familiaris khamensis Bianchi, 1903; Certhia familiaris mandellii Brooks, 1874

= Hodgson's treecreeper =

Species of bird

Hodgson's treecreeper (Certhia hodgsoni) is a small passerine bird from the southern rim of the Himalayas. Its specific distinctness from the common treecreeper (C. familiaris) was recently validated.

== Description ==
This is a small bird, 12.5 cm (4.9 in) long, of fairly drab appearance. It is brownish with lighter and darker streaks above, and off-white below and on the supercilium. It is browner above than the common treecreeper (C. familiaris), with a contrasting rufous rump. It has a long curved bill and long stiff tail feathers.

The song starts with two of the shree calls characteristic for this species and its close relatives. Then follow one or a few warbling calls, and finally (usually) two up- and downslurring notes. Each sound is about 0.3 seconds long, and the whole song takes about 2 to 2.5 seconds. It drops in pitch at a constant rate from around 7.5 kHz initially to 6 kHz, slurring down to 4 kHz once or twice in the end.

== Systematics and taxonomy ==
It has three subspecies, from west to east:

- Certhia hodgsoni hodgsoni Brooks, 1871 – N Pakistan to NW India
- Certhia hodgsoni mandellii Brooks, 1874 – Nepal, Bhutan, NE India
- Certhia hodgsoni khamensis Bianchi, 1903, Kham treecreeper – SW China, Myanmar and perhaps NE India

This treecreeper was formerly included in the common treecreeper (C. familiaris), but is now believed to constitute a distinct species. It is the southeastern representative of the Holarctic lineage of treecreepers, most closely related to its sister species C. familiaris and to the North Atlantic superspecies short-toed treecreeper (C. brachydactylata) and American treecreeper (C. americana).

Though the Certhiidae are very diverse in the Himalayan region, the other species found there belong to a lineage distinct from Hodgson's treecreeper. While the present species is an allopatric offshoot of the Holarctic group, the other Himalayan treecreepers are parapatric members of a group that probably radiated out from the subtropical southern China region.

The English and scientific names of this species commemorate Brian Houghton Hodgson, a 19th-century English naturalist and ethnologist working in British India.

== Range and ecology ==
Hodgson's treecreeper is found in the countries of Bhutan, China, India, Myanmar, Nepal and Pakistan. It inhabits temperate to cool tropical montane forests. Mostly resident in coniferous woodlands, it may move downhill to oak/rhododendron woodlands in winter. However, in Bhutan for example C. h. mandellii is not uncommon all year round in moist Bhutan fir (Abies densa) forests between approximately 3,000 and 4,000 meters ASL. The stiff tail feathers enable the bird to creep up vertical tree trunks looking for arthropod prey. It nests in tree crevices, and 4–6 reddish-brown blotched pinkish-white eggs are the typical clutch size.

Although the stretched-out range of this rather sedentary species is prone to habitat fragmentation in the long run, C. hodgsoni is just as common as its northern relatives. The IUCN therefore considers it a Species of least concern.
