= Brown-throated treecreeper =

Brown-throated treecreeper can refer to two species of Certhia:

- Sikkim treecreeper, Certhia discolor
- Hume's treecreeper, Certhia manipurensis
