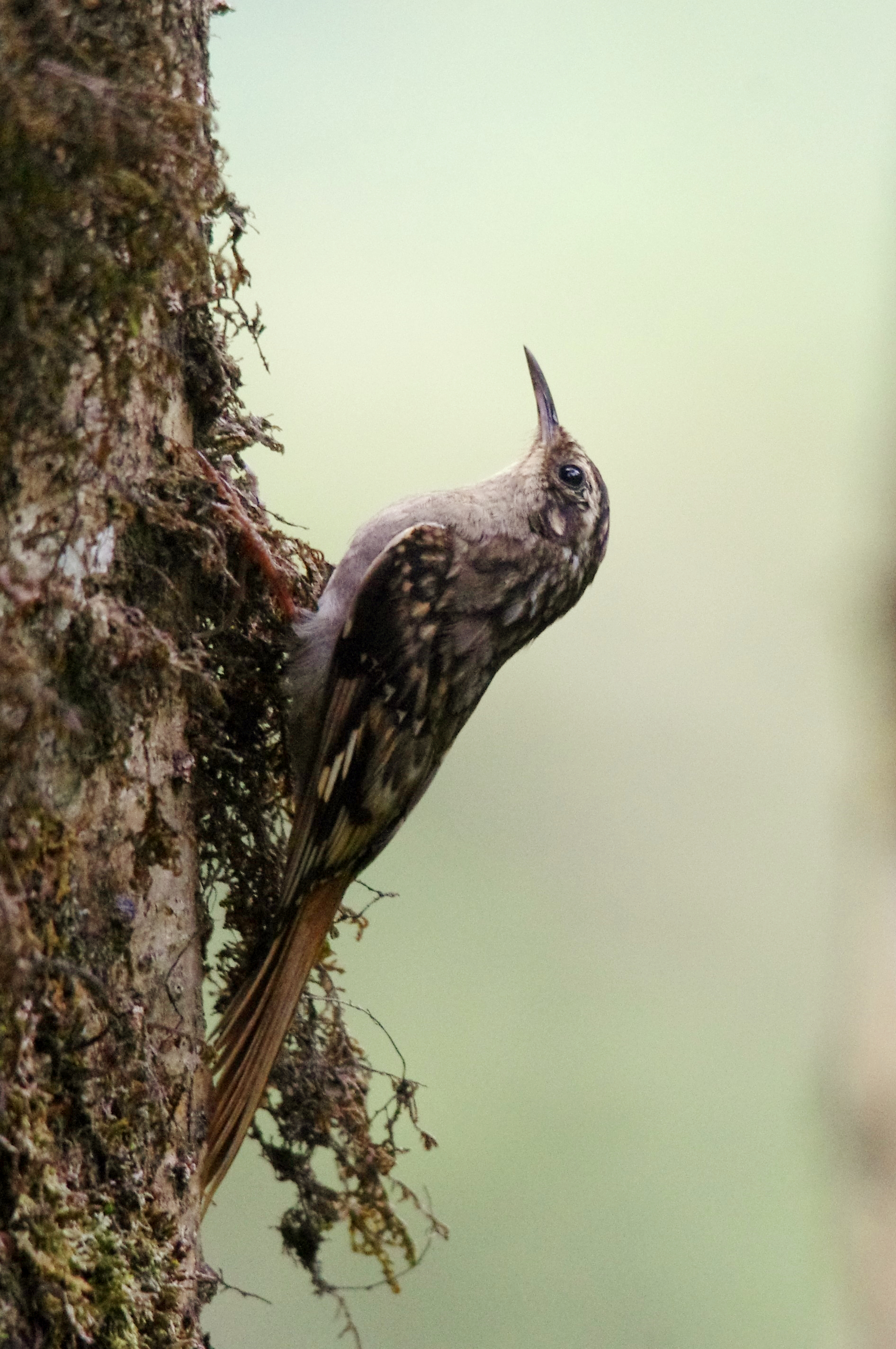
- From Neora Valley National Park, West Bengal, India

Conservation status
- Least Concern (IUCN 3.1)

Scientific classification
- Kingdom: Animalia
- Phylum: Chordata
- Class: Aves
- Order: Passeriformes
- Family: Certhiidae
- Genus: Certhia
- Species: C. discolor

Binomial name
- Certhia discolor Blyth, 1845

= Sikkim treecreeper =

Species of bird

The Sikkim treecreeper (Certhia discolor) is a species of bird in the treecreeper family.

It is found in Bhutan, Nepal and Northeast India.

Its natural habitats are temperate forests and subtropical or tropical moist montane forests. It inhabits broadleaf and mixed forests, where it usually forages at the middle and upper levels.

The form C. d. manipurensis of southern Manipur and southwestern Burma has a rich cinnamon throat and breast, and molecular evidence and is usually now treated as a separate species, the Hume's treecreeper, C. manipurensis Hume, 1850.
