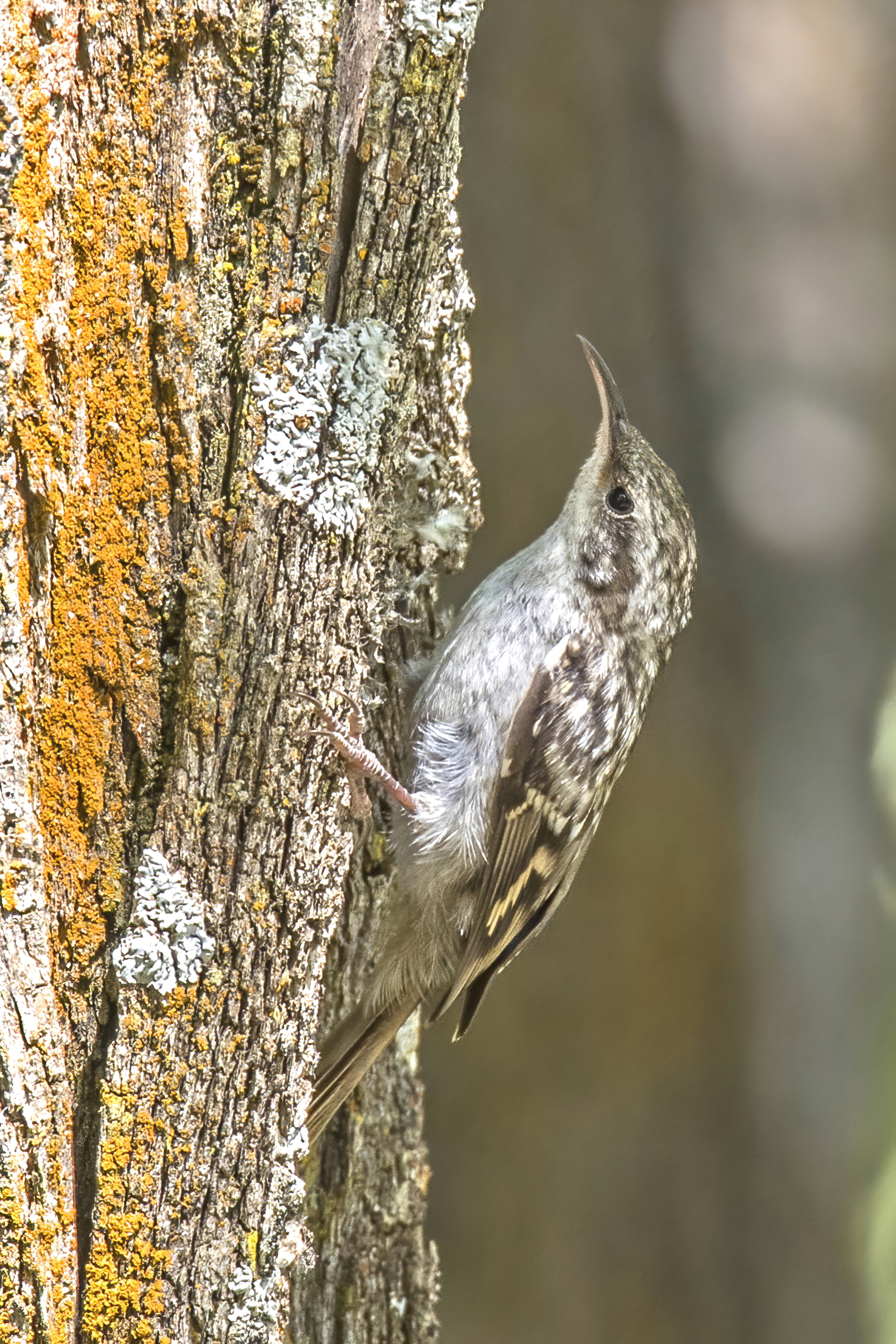
- Cyprus subspecies of short-toed treecreeper Certhia brachydactyla dorotheae

Scientific classification
- Kingdom: Animalia
- Phylum: Chordata
- Class: Aves
- Order: Passeriformes
- Superfamily: Certhioidea
- Family: Certhiidae; Leach, 1820

Genera
- Certhia

= Treecreeper =

Treecreepers

Family of birds

The treecreepers are a family, Certhiidae, of small passerine birds, widespread in wooded regions of the Northern Hemisphere. The family contains nine species in one genus, Certhia. Their plumage is dull-coloured. As their name implies, they climb over the vertical surfaces of trees in search of food.

== Taxonomy and systematics ==
Some taxonomists place the nuthatches and treecreepers in a larger grouping with the wrens and gnatcatchers. This superfamily, the Certhioidea, was based on phylogenetic studies using mitochondrial and nuclear DNA, and was created to cover a clade of four families removed from a larger grouping of passerine birds, the Sylvioidea. The fossil record for this group appears to be restricted to a foot bone of an early Miocene bird from Bavaria which has been identified as an extinct representative of the climbing Certhioidea, a clade comprising the treecreepers, wallcreeper and nuthatches. It has been described as Certhiops rummeli.

- Certhioidea
  - Tichodromidae: wallcreeper – 1 species
  - - Sittidae: nuthatches – 29 species
    - - - Salpornithidae: spotted creepers – 2 species
        - Certhiidae: treecreepers – 9 species
      - - Polioptilidae: gnatcatchers – 20 species
        - Troglodytidae: wrens – 96 species

Relationships among families in the superfamily Certhioidea.

The genus name is derived from Ancient Greek kerthios, a small tree-dwelling bird described by Aristotle and others.

There are two other small bird families with treecreeper or creeper in their name, which are not closely related:

- the Australian treecreepers (Climacteridae)
- the Philippine creepers (Rhabdornithidae)

The wallcreeper was originally described in the family Certhiidae but is now considered as more closely related to the nuthatches. The woodcreepers (subfamily Dendrocolaptinae) also have a similar name.

=== Species in taxonomic order ===
Genus Certhia

Image	Common name	Scientific name
	Eurasian treecreeper or common treecreeper	Certhia familiaris
	Hodgson's treecreeper	Certhia hodgsoni (split from C. familiaris)
	Brown creeper	Certhia americana
	Short-toed treecreeper	Certhia brachydactyla
	Bar-tailed treecreeper or Himalayan treecreeper	Certhia himalayana
	Sichuan treecreeper	Certhia tianquanensis
	Rusty-flanked treecreeper or Nepal treecreeper	Certhia nipalensis
	Sikkim treecreeper or brown-throated treecreeper	Certhia discolor
	Hume's treecreeper	Certhia manipurensis (split from C. discolor)

An extinct treecreeper, Certhia rummeli, was described from a fossilized right tarsometatarsus found in karstic fissure fillings in Petersbuch, Bavaria by German paleornithologist Albrecht Manegold. This specimen implies the branching of Certhioidea occurred 20 MYA, and represents the oldest fossil passerine assignable to an extant subordinated clade of oscines in the Northern Hemisphere.

== Description ==
Treecreepers measure from 12 to 18 centimetres (4.7 to 7.1 in) in length. Their bills are gently down-curved and rather long, used for probing bark for insects and spiders. They often climb up tree trunks in a helical path, hopping with their feet together; their toes are long and tipped with strongly curved claws for gripping. The longer tails of the Certhia treecreepers are stiffened to use as a prop while climbing, but those of the spotted creeper are shorter and not stiffened. Their songs and calls are thin and high-pitched.

== Distribution and habitat ==
Most species of treecreeper occur in the Palearctic and Indomalayan realms, from Western Europe to Japan and India. One species occurs in North America from Alaska to Nicaragua. All species of treecreeper are found in forest and woodland habitats. The more northerly species are partly migratory, and those found in warmer climates are thought to be resident, although information is lacking for many species.

== Behaviour and ecology ==
Treecreepers are generally unobtrusive and are often indifferent to humans. They occur as singles or in pairs, sometimes in small family groups after fledging. Communal roosting has been observed in three species (and may occur in more), with as many as 20 birds sharing a roosting hole in order to conserve warmth.

Treecreepers forage on the trunks of large trees. They move up the trunk in a progression of small hops. They fly to the bottom of a tree, then climb in a spiral fashion searching for prey. The majority of their diet is composed of small invertebrates, including insects and their larvae, spiders, spider eggs, and pseudoscorpions. In hard times seeds and fruits may be taken, and a few species will also visit birdfeeders. Species in both genera have been recorded joining mixed-species feeding flocks.

The treecreepers are monogamous and territorial. Nests and eggs vary between the creepers: the Certhia treecreepers usually nest in a gap between the tree bark and the tree, whereas the nest of the spotted creeper is placed in the fork of a branch. Incubation lasts 14 to 15 days, and young fledge after 15 to 16 days.
