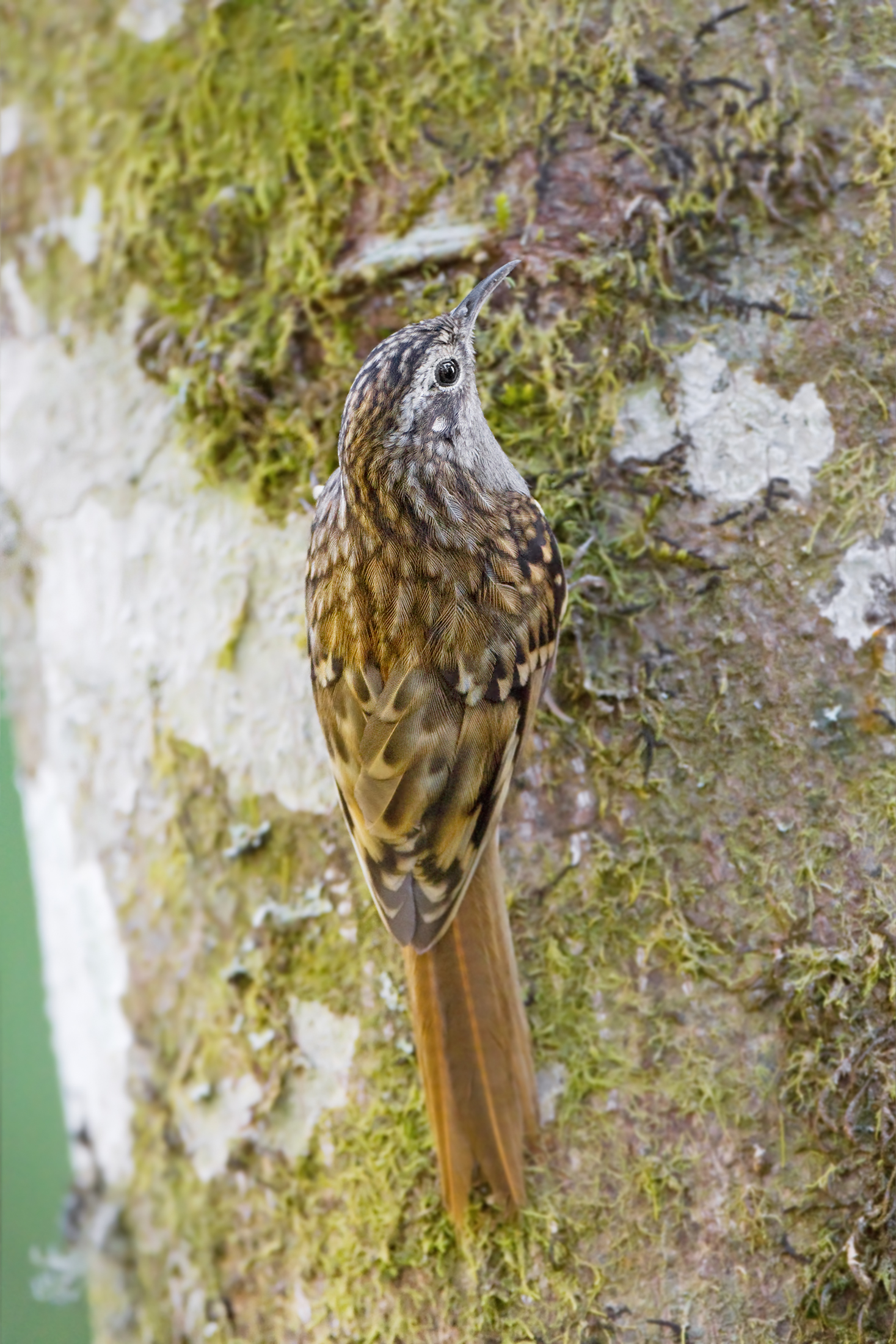
- In Chiang Mai, Thailand

Conservation status
- Least Concern (IUCN 3.1)

Scientific classification
- Kingdom: Animalia
- Phylum: Chordata
- Class: Aves
- Order: Passeriformes
- Family: Certhiidae
- Genus: Certhia
- Species: C. manipurensis

Binomial name
- Certhia manipurensis Hume, 1881

= Hume's treecreeper =

Species of bird

Hume's treecreeper (Certhia manipurensis) was earlier included within the brown-throated treecreeper complex and identified as a separate species on the basis of their distinctive calls. This species in the treecreeper family is found in Assam, Myanmar, Shan Mountains, Northern Thailand, Laos and the Dalat Plateau.

This form has a rich cinnamon throat and breast with support for their status coming from nd molecular evidence and calls.

The name commemorates the British naturalist Allan Octavian Hume who worked in India.
