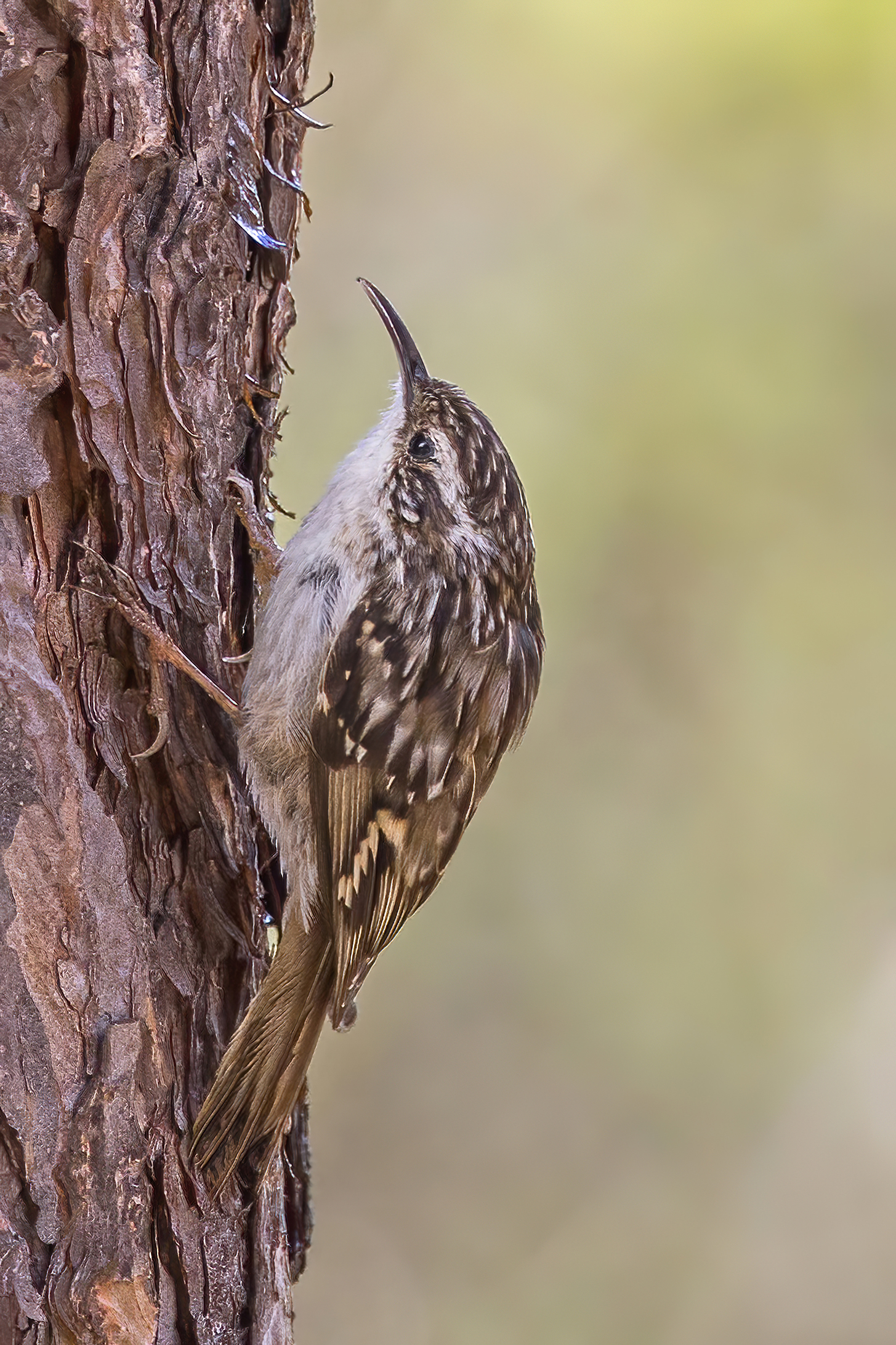
- Certhia brachydactyla brachydactyla, Spain

Conservation status
- Least Concern (IUCN 3.1)

Scientific classification
- Kingdom: Animalia
- Phylum: Chordata
- Class: Aves
- Order: Passeriformes
- Family: Certhiidae
- Genus: Certhia
- Species: C. brachydactyla

Binomial name
- Certhia brachydactyla Brehm, 1820
- Range of C. brachydactyla Resident

= Short-toed treecreeper =

Species of bird

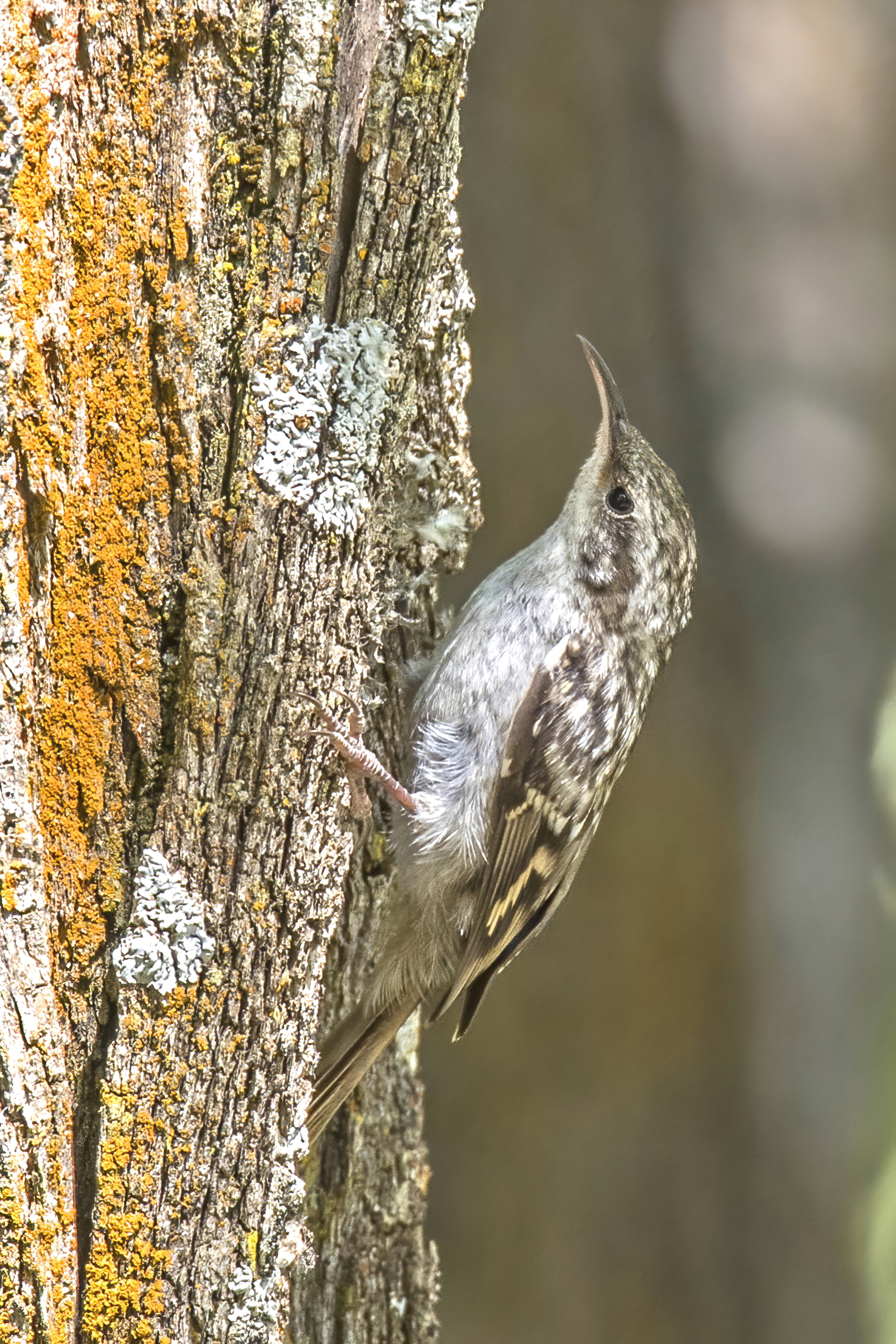
Certhia brachydactyla dorotheae, Cyprus

The short-toed treecreeper (Certhia brachydactyla) is a small passerine bird found in woodlands through much of the warmer regions of Europe and into north Africa. It has a generally more southerly distribution than the other European treecreeper species, the common treecreeper, with which it is easily confused where they both occur. The short-toed treecreeper tends to prefer deciduous trees and lower altitudes than its relative in these overlap areas. Although mainly sedentary, vagrants have occurred outside the breeding range.

The short-toed treecreeper is one of a group of four very similar Holarctic treecreepers, including the closely related North American brown creepers, and has five subspecies differing in appearance and song. Like other treecreepers, the short-toed is inconspicuously plumaged brown above and whitish below, and has a curved bill and stiff tail feathers. It is a resident in woodlands throughout its range, and nests in tree crevices or behind bark flakes, laying about six eggs. This common, unwary, but inconspicuous species feeds mainly on insects which are picked from the tree trunk as the treecreeper ascends with short hops.

== Taxonomy ==
The short-toed treecreeper was first described by Christian Ludwig Brehm in 1820. The binomial name is derived from Greek; kerthios is a small tree-dwelling bird described by Aristotle and others, and brachydactyla comes from brakhus, "short" and dactulos "finger", which refers, like the English name, to the fact that this species has shorter toes than the common treecreeper.

This species is one of a group of very similar treecreeper species, all placed in the single genus Certhia. Eight species are currently recognised, in two evolutionary lineages, a Holarctic radiation, and a Sino-Himalayan group south and east of the Himalayas. The former group has a more warbling song, always (except in C. familiaris from China) starting or ending with a shrill sreeh. The Himalayan species, in contrast, have a faster-paced trill without the sreeh sound. The short-toed treecreeper belongs to the northern group, along with the North American brown creeper, C. americana, the common treecreeper, C. familaris, of temperate Eurasia, and Hodgson's treecreeper, C. hodgsoni, from the southern rim of the Himalayas.

=== Subspecies ===
There are five subspecies of short-toed treecreeper, which are all very similar and often intergrade in areas where their ranges overlap. There is a general cline in appearance from west to east across Europe, with upperparts becoming a darker and colder brown. The currently recognised subspecies are as follows:

Subspecies	Range	Notes
Certhia brachydactyla megarhynchos	Channel Islands and western Europe in northwest Spain, western and northern France, Belgium, the Netherlands and western Germany.	See "Description". Western birds are paler and more rufous than those further east.
Certhia brachydactyla brachydactyla	Continental Europe east of C. b. megarhynchos, Sicily and Crete.	The nominate subspecies; darker and colder brown above and more clearly white-streaked below than C. b. megarhynchos.
Certhia brachydactyla mauritanica	North Africa.	Darker and colder brown upperparts and more extensively buff-washed underparts than nominate subspecies. Different song.
Certhia brachydactyla dorotheae	Cyprus.	Greyer upperparts and purer white underparts than nominate. Different song.
Certhia brachydactyla harterti	Asia Minor and the Caucasus.	Similar to C. b. megarhynchos, but duller rufous upperparts.

== Description ==
All the treecreepers are similar in appearance, being small birds with streaked and spotted brown upperparts, rufous rumps and whitish underparts. They have long decurved bills, and long stiff tail feathers which provide support as they creep up tree trunks looking for insects.

The short-toed treecreeper is 12.5 centimetres (4.9 inches) long and weighs 7.5–11 g (0.26–0.39 oz). It has dull grey-brown upperparts intricately patterned with black, buff and white, a weak off-white supercilium and dingy underparts contrasting with the white throat. The sexes are similar, but juveniles have whitish underparts, sometimes with a buff belly.

The call of this species is a repeated shrill tyt...tyt tyt-tyt and the song of the nominate subspecies is an evenly spaced sequence of notes teet-teet-teet-e-roi-tiit. There is some geographical variation; the song of Danish birds is shorter, that of the Cyprus subspecies is very short and simple, and the North African version is lower pitched. European birds do not respond to latter two song variants.

This species shares much of its range with the common treecreeper. Compared to the short-toed, that bird is whiter below, warmer and more spotted above, and has a whiter supercilium and slightly shorter bill. However, identification by sight may be impossible for poorly-marked birds. Vocal birds are usually identifiable, since Common has a distinctive song composed of twitters, ripples and a final whistle and a shree call rarely given by the short-toed; however, both species have been known to sing the other's song. Even in the hand, although the short-toed usually has a longer bill and shorter toes, 5% of birds are not safely identifiable.

The brown treecreeper has never been recorded in Europe, but would be difficult to separate from the short-toed treecreeper, which it much resembles in appearance. Its call is more like the common treecreeper's, but a vagrant brown treecreeper might still not be possible to identify with certainty given the similarities between the three species.

== Distribution and habitat ==
Cork oak is a preferred nesting tree in Spain.

The short-toed treecreeper breeds in temperate woodlands across Europe from Portugal to Turkey and Greece, and in north west Africa. It prefers well-grown trees, especially oak and avoids pure stands of conifers. Where it shares its European range with common treecreeper, the latter species tends to be found mainly in coniferous forest and at higher altitudes.

It is usually found in the lowlands, but breeds locally at up to 900 metres (3,000 feet) in Germany, 1,800 metres (5,900 feet) in France and 1,400 metres (4,600 feet) in Switzerland. In Turkey and North Africa it is a mountain species. The breeding areas have July isotherms between 17–18 °C and 26 °C (63–64 °F and 79 °F).

This treecreeper is essentially non-migratory but post-breeding dispersal may lead to vagrancy outside the normal range. It has occurred as a vagrant to England, Sweden (where it is now a breeding bird), Lithuania and the Balearic Islands. Three birds on Corsica in 1969 appeared to be of the North African subspecies C. b. mauritanica.

== Behaviour and ecology ==
=== Breeding ===
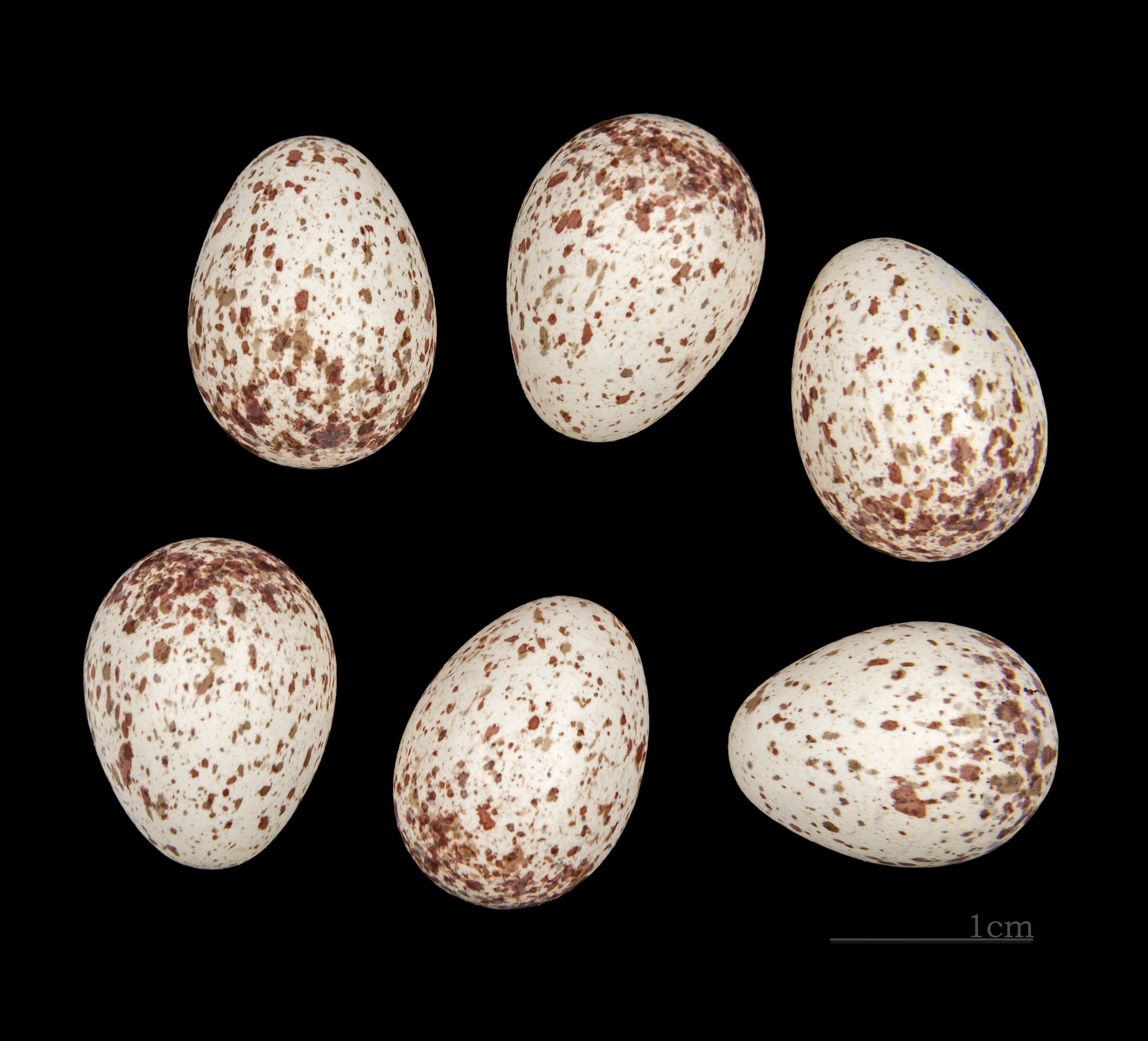
Eggs of Certhia brachydactyla MHNT

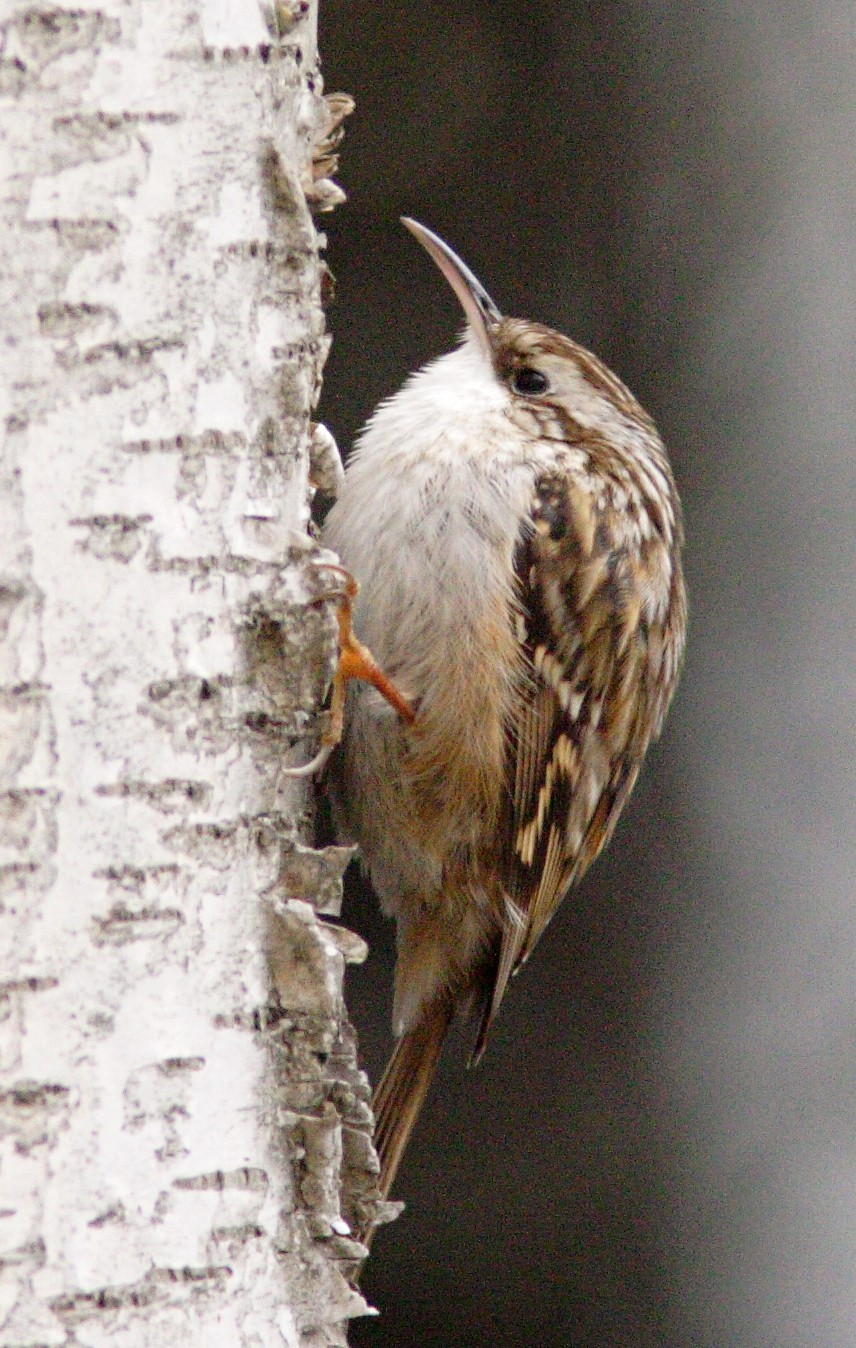
Adult foraging on a trunk

The short-toed nests in tree crevices or behind bark flakes. Old woodpecker nests, crevices in buildings or walls, and artificial nest boxes or flaps are also used.

The nest has an often bulky base of twigs, pine needles, grass or bark, and a lining of finer material such as feathers, wool, moss, lichen or spider web. The eggs are laid between April and mid June (typical clutch 5–7 eggs); they are white with purple-red blotches, 15.6 mm × 12.2 mm (0.61 in × 0.48 in) in size. The eggs are incubated by the female alone for 13 – 15 days until the altricial downy chicks hatch; they are then fed by both parents, but brooded by the female alone, for a further 15 – 18 days to fledging. This species often raises a second brood. The male starts constructing a new nest while the female is still feeding the first brood, and when the chicks are 10–12 days old, he takes over feeding duties while the female completes the new nest.

A Spanish study suggests that forest fragmentation adversely affects the numbers of short-toed treecreepers present, as is also the case with the common treecreeper. Species that depend on relatively scarce resources, such as tree trunks, only occupy the larger forests, whereas those such as tits and common firecrests that exploit abundant, ubiquitous resources are distributed uniformly through woodlands of all sizes.

=== Feeding ===
The short-toed treecreeper typically seeks invertebrate food on tree trunks, starting near the tree base and spiralling its way up using its stiff tail feathers for support. Unlike a nuthatch, it does not come down trees head first, but flies to the base of another nearby tree. It uses its long thin bill to extract insects and spiders from crevices in the bark. Although normally found on trees, it will occasionally feed on walls or bare ground, or amongst fallen pine needles. It may add some seeds to its diet in the colder months.

=== Habits ===
As a small woodland bird with cryptic plumage and a quiet call, the short-toed treecreeper is easily overlooked as it hops mouse-like up a vertical trunk, progressing in short hops, using its stiff tail and widely splayed feet as support. Nevertheless, it is not wary, and is largely indifferent to the presence of humans. It has a distinctive erratic and undulating flight, alternating fluttering butterfly-like wing beats with side-slips and tumbles. It is solitary in winter, but in cold weather up to twenty or more birds will roost together in a suitable sheltered crevice, or in a star formation under eaves of buildings.

== Status and conservation ==
This species has an extensive range of between 1–10 million square kilometres (0.4–3.8 million square mi). It has a large population, estimated at between 4.1–14 million individuals. Population trends have not been quantified, but the species is not believed to approach the thresholds for the population decline criterion of the IUCN Red List (declining more than 30% in ten years or three generations). For these reasons, the short-toed treecreeper is evaluated as Least Concern.

It is common through much of its range, but is rare in the Caucasus and on the smaller Channel Islands. In the west of its range it is spreading north through Denmark, where it first bred in 1946.
