= Bar-tailed treecreeper =

- Bar-tailed Treecreeper in Mayoon Berr, Pakistan

Conservation status
- Least Concern (IUCN 3.1)

Scientific classification
- Kingdom: Animalia
- Phylum: Chordata
- Class: Aves
- Order: Passeriformes
- Family: Certhiidae
- Genus: Certhia
- Species: C. himalayana

Binomial name
- Certhia himalayana Vigors, 1832

Subspecies
- C. h. himalayana; C. h. taeniura; C. h. yunnanensis; C. h. ripponi

Species of bird

The bar-tailed treecreeper (Certhia himalayana), or the Himalayan treecreeper, is a species of bird in the family Certhiidae. It is found primarily in the northern parts of the Indian subcontinent, particularly in the Himalayas, as well as in adjoining regions. It is found in Afghanistan, India, Iran, Kazakhstan, Myanmar, Nepal, Tibet, Russia, Tajikistan, Turkmenistan, and Uzbekistan. Its natural habitats are boreal forests and temperate forests.

== Description ==
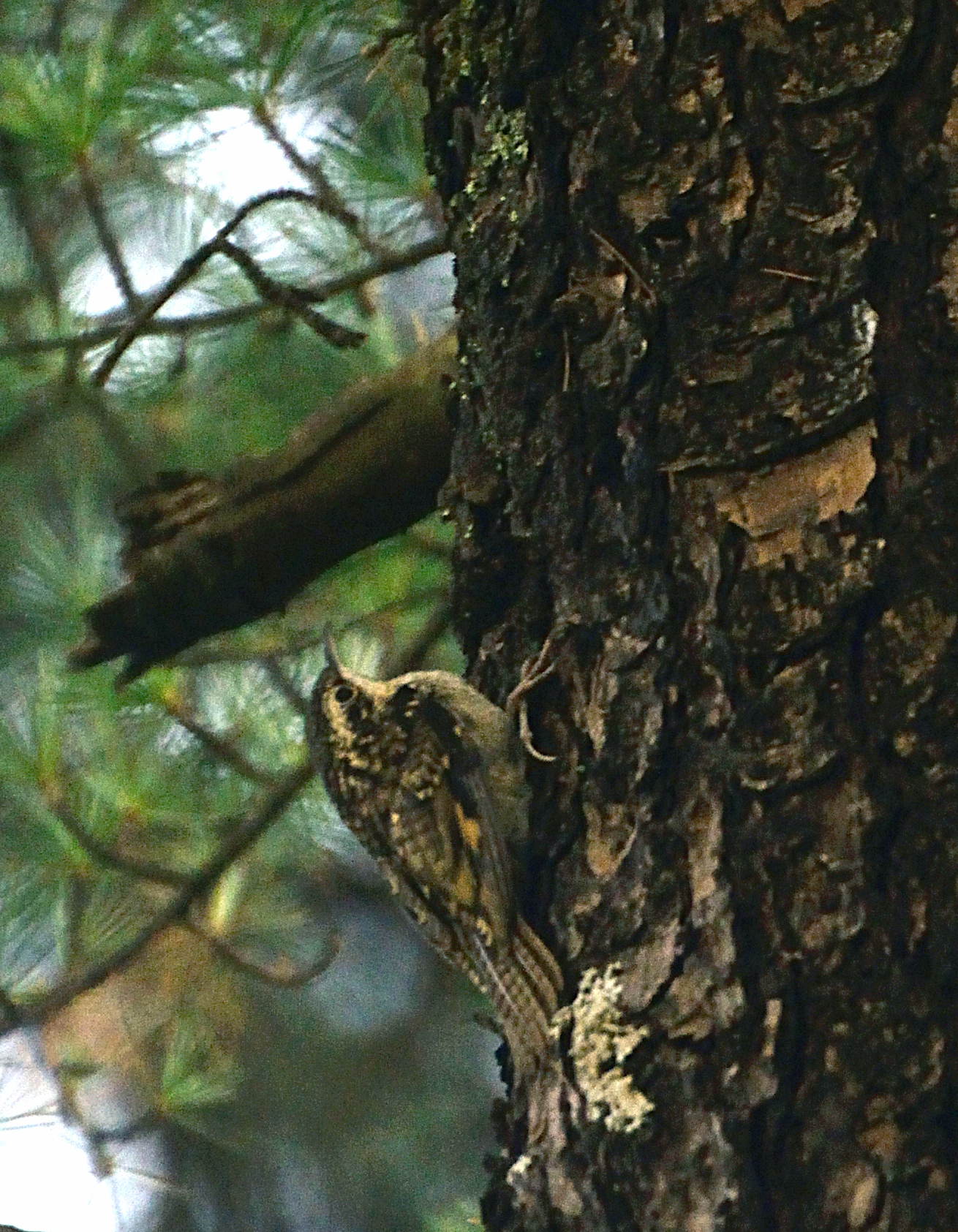
A juvenile bar-tailed treecreeper from Dharamkot, Himachal

The bar-tailed treecreeper has a flecked or striped feather pattern, usually in black, brown, white and red hues. This coloration allows the treecreeper to blend in with its forest surroundings quite well.
