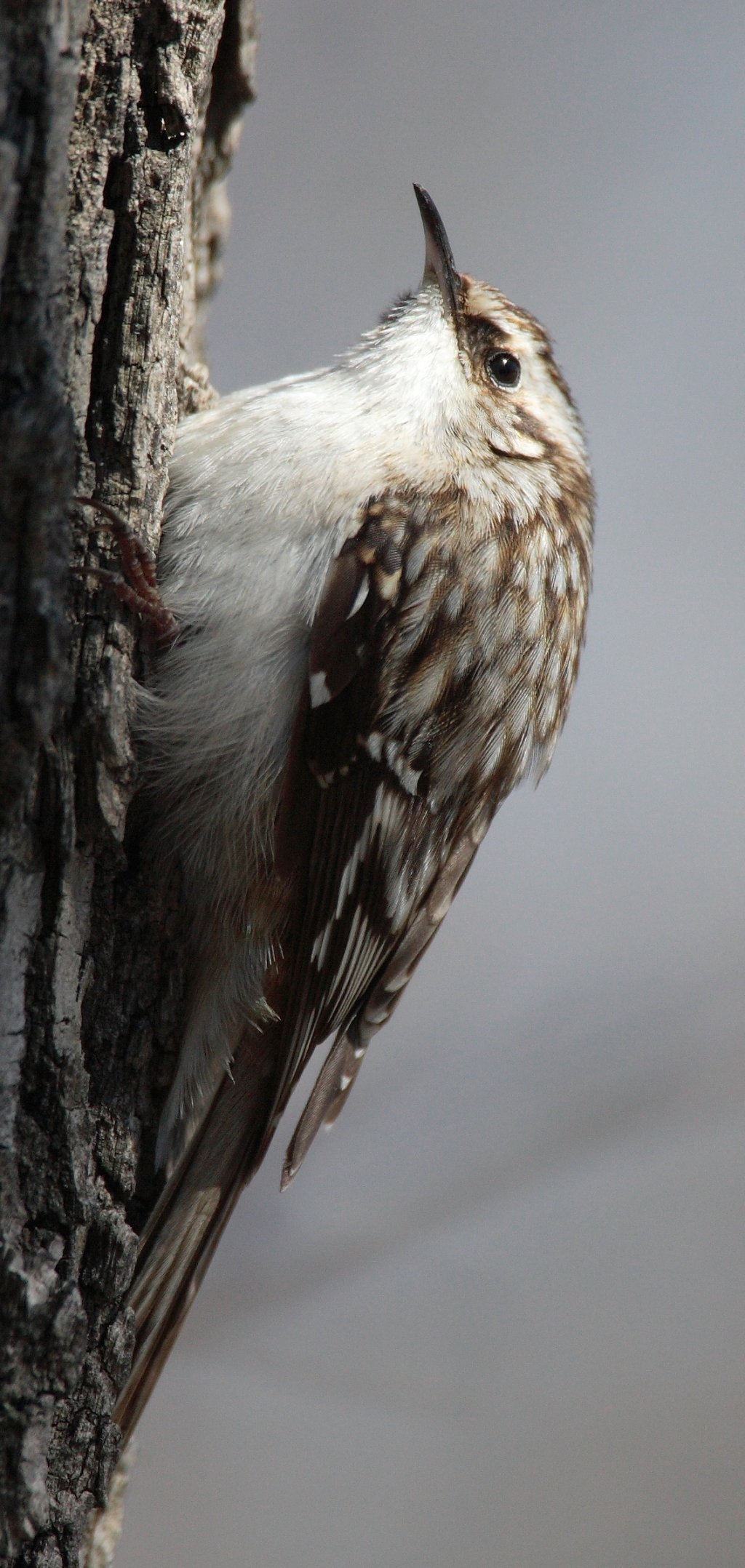
- Brown creeper (Certhia americana)

Scientific classification
- Kingdom: Animalia
- Phylum: Chordata
- Class: Aves
- Order: Passeriformes
- Family: Certhiidae
- Genus: Certhia; Linnaeus, 1758

Type species
- Certhia familiaris (Eurasian treecreeper) Linnaeus, 1758

Species
- See text

= Certhia =

Genus of birds

Certhia is the genus of birds containing the typical treecreepers, which makes up the family Certhiidae.

The typical treecreepers occur in many wooded parts of the North Temperate Zone. They do not normally migrate other than for local movements, such as altitudinal migrations in the Himalayan species.

The treecreepers are small woodland birds, very similar in appearance (so they can present serious identification problems where two species occur together). They are brown with streaks above and white below. They have thin pointed down-curved bills, which they use to extricate insects from bark. They have stiff, pointed tail feathers, like woodpeckers and woodcreepers, which they use to support themselves on vertical trees. All the tail feathers but the two central ones are molted in quick succession; the two central ones are not molted till the others grow back, so the bird can always prop itself with its tail.

They build cup nests on loose twig platforms wedged behind patches of bark on tree trunks. (They will also use special nest boxes clamped to tree trunks and made with two openings; the birds use one as an entrance and one as an exit.) They lay 3 to 9 eggs (usually 5 or 6), which are white with reddish-brown speckles and dots. The female incubates for 14 or 15 days. The young fledge 15 or 16 days later; the male may care for them while the female incubates and feeds a second brood. Rarely a male may mate with a second female while the first is incubating, and there are even records of two females incubating their clutches side by side in a nest.

At least some species roost in small oblong cavities that they dig out behind loose bark. They may roost individually or in groups (probably families) that in extreme cold have been known to exceed 12 birds.

== Taxonomy ==
The genus Certhia was introduced in 1758 by the Swedish naturalist Carl Linnaeus in the tenth edition of his Systema Naturae. The genus name is from the Ancient Greek κερθιος/kerthios, a small insectivorous bird that lived in trees mentioned by Aristotle, perhaps a treecreeper. The type species is the Eurasian treecreeper (Certhia familiaris).

=== Species ===
Based on studies of cytochrome b mtDNA sequence and song structure, the following nine species are recognized:

Image	Common name	Scientific name
	Eurasian treecreeper or common treecreeper	Certhia familiaris
	Hodgson's treecreeper	Certhia hodgsoni (split from C. familiaris)
	Brown creeper	Certhia americana
	Short-toed treecreeper	Certhia brachydactyla
	Bar-tailed treecreeper or Himalayan treecreeper	Certhia himalayana
	Sichuan treecreeper	Certhia tianquanensis
	Rusty-flanked treecreeper or Nepal treecreeper	Certhia nipalensis
	Sikkim treecreeper or brown-throated treecreeper	Certhia discolor
	Hume's treecreeper	Certhia manipurensis (split from C. discolor)

They form two evolutionary lineages: the former four species represent a Holarctic radiation, whereas the remaining five are distributed in the area south and east of the Himalaya. Hodgson's treecreeper, recently realized to be a distinct species, is an offshoot of the common treecreeper's ancestor which has speciated south of the Himalaya. The former group has a more warbling song, always (except in C. familiaris from China) starting or ending with a shrill sreeh. The Himalayan group, in contrast, has a faster-paced trill without the sreeh sound.

== Fossil record ==
Certhia immensa (Pliocene of Csarnota, Hungary)
