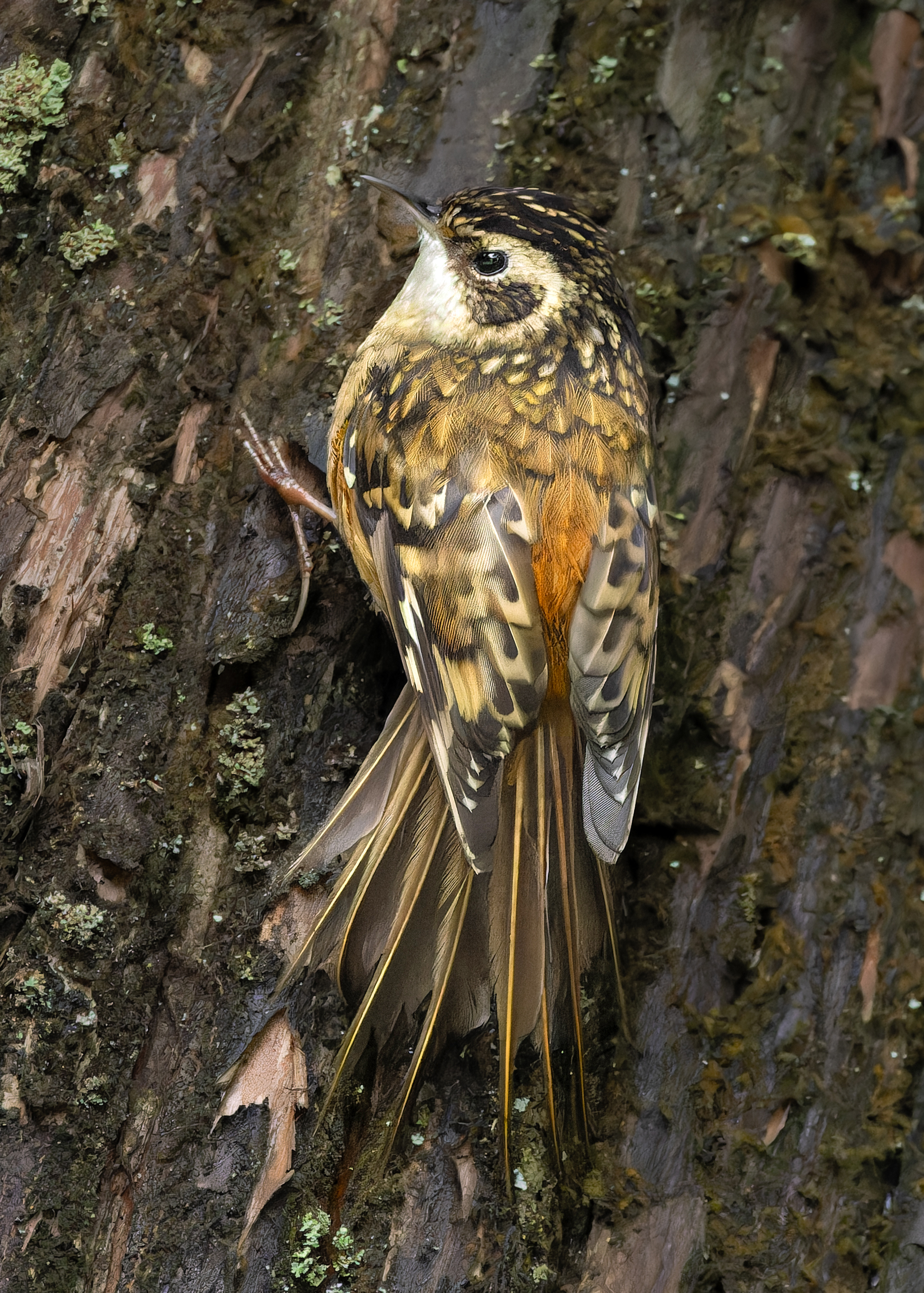
- Rusty-flanked Treecreeper (Certhia nipalensis) in Senchal Wildlife Sanctuary, West Bengal, India.

Conservation status
- Least Concern (IUCN 3.1)

Scientific classification
- Kingdom: Animalia
- Phylum: Chordata
- Class: Aves
- Order: Passeriformes
- Family: Certhiidae
- Genus: Certhia
- Species: C. nipalensis

Binomial name
- Certhia nipalensis Blyth, 1845

= Rusty-flanked treecreeper =

Species of bird

The rusty-flanked treecreeper (Certhia nipalensis) or the Nepal treecreeper is a species of bird in the family Certhiidae. It is found in northern India, Nepal, Bhutan and western Yunnan. Its natural habitats are boreal forests and temperate forests.
