= List of birds of Gibraltar =

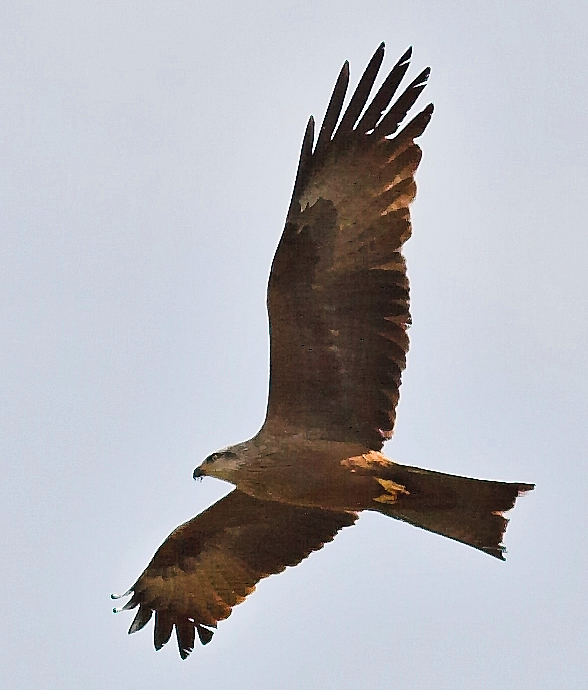
Large numbers of black kites and other birds of prey migrate via the Straits of Gibraltar.

The avifauna of Gibraltar include a total of 325 species, of which 3 have been introduced by humans. The majority of the introduced species are wanderers from introduced populations in Spain.

This list's taxonomic treatment (designation and sequence of orders, families and species) and nomenclature (common and scientific names) follow the conventions of the IOC World Bird List with a few changes to match the list of the Gibraltar Ornithological & Natural History Society.

The following tags have been used to highlight categories. Vagrant and established introduced species are included in the total counts for Gibraltar.

- (A) recorded in a natural wild state in Gibraltar since 1 January 1950
- (B) recorded in a natural wild state in Gibraltar but only before 1 January 1950
- (C) introduced – a species which occurs in Gibraltar as a consequence, direct or indirect, of human actions

== Ducks, geese, and waterfowl ==
Order: Anseriformes Family: Anatidae

The family Anatidae includes the ducks and most duck-like waterfowl, such as geese and swans. These are birds adapted to an aquatic existence with webbed feet, flattened bills, and feathers that are excellent at shedding water due to an oily coating.

- Mute swan Cygnus olor (A)
- Greylag goose, Anser anser (A)
- Common shelduck, Tadorna tadorna (A)
- Garganey, Spatula querquedula (A)
- Gadwall, Mareca strepera (A)
- Eurasian wigeon, Mareca penelope (A)
- Mallard, Anas platyrhynchos (A)
- Northern pintail, Anas acuta (A)
- Eurasian teal, Anas crecca (A)
- Tufted duck, Aythya fuligula (B)
- Greater scaup, Aythya marila (B)
- Common eider, Somateria mollissima (A)
- Common scoter, Melanitta nigra (A)
- Red-breasted merganser, Mergus serrator (A)

== Pheasants, grouse, and allies ==
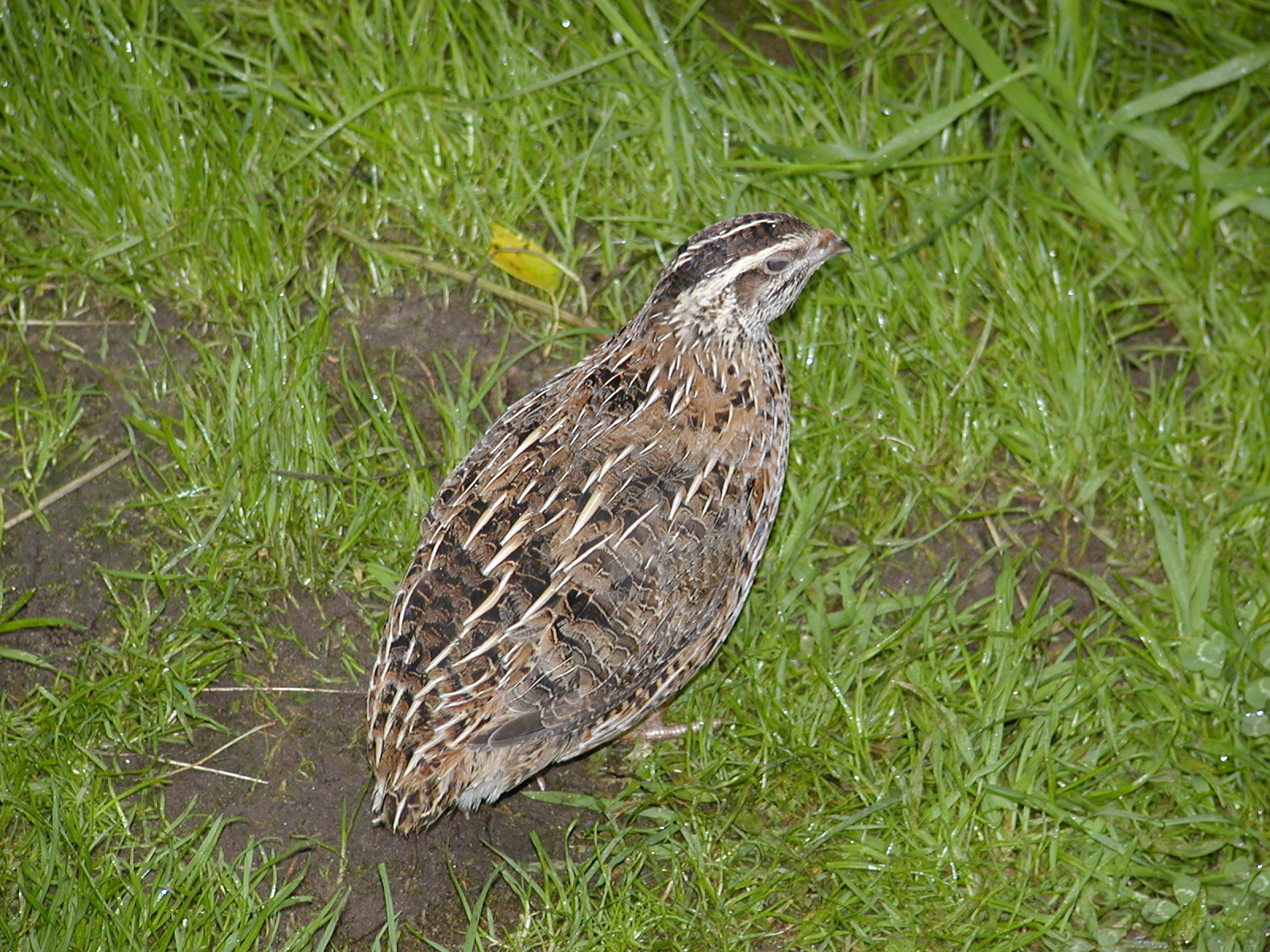
Common quail, a scarce migrant.

Order: Galliformes Family: Phasianidae

The Phasianidae are a family of terrestrial birds. In general, they are plump (although they vary in size) and have broad, relatively short wings.

- Common quail, Coturnix coturnix (A)
- Barbary partridge, Alectoris barbara (A)

== Nightjars and allies ==
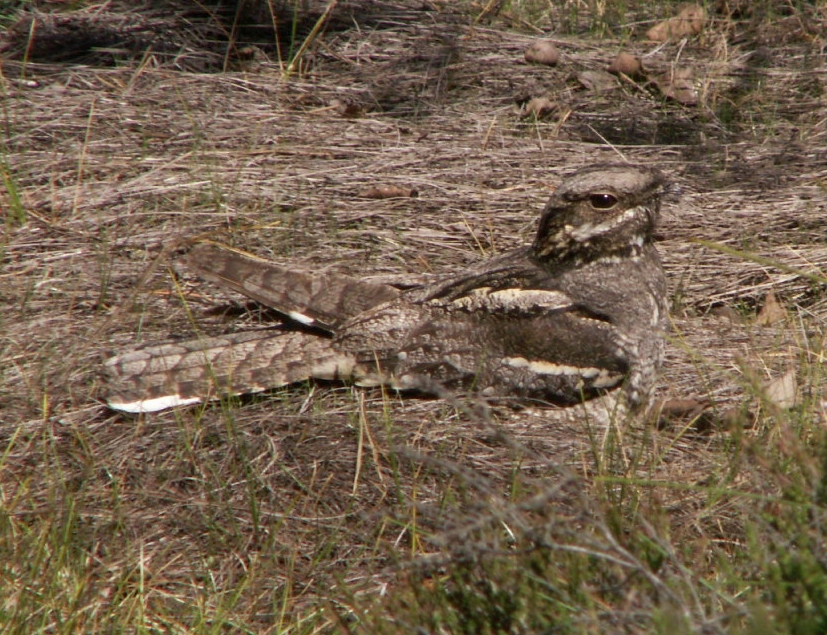
European nightjar, regular on passage.

Order: Caprimulgiformes Family: Caprimulgidae

Nightjars are medium-sized nocturnal birds that usually nest on the ground. They have long wings, short legs and very short bills. Most have small feet, of little use for walking, and long pointed wings. Their soft plumage is camouflaged to resemble bark or leaves.

- Red-necked nightjar, Caprimulgus ruficollis (A)
- Eurasian nightjar, Caprimulgus europaeus (A)

== Swifts ==
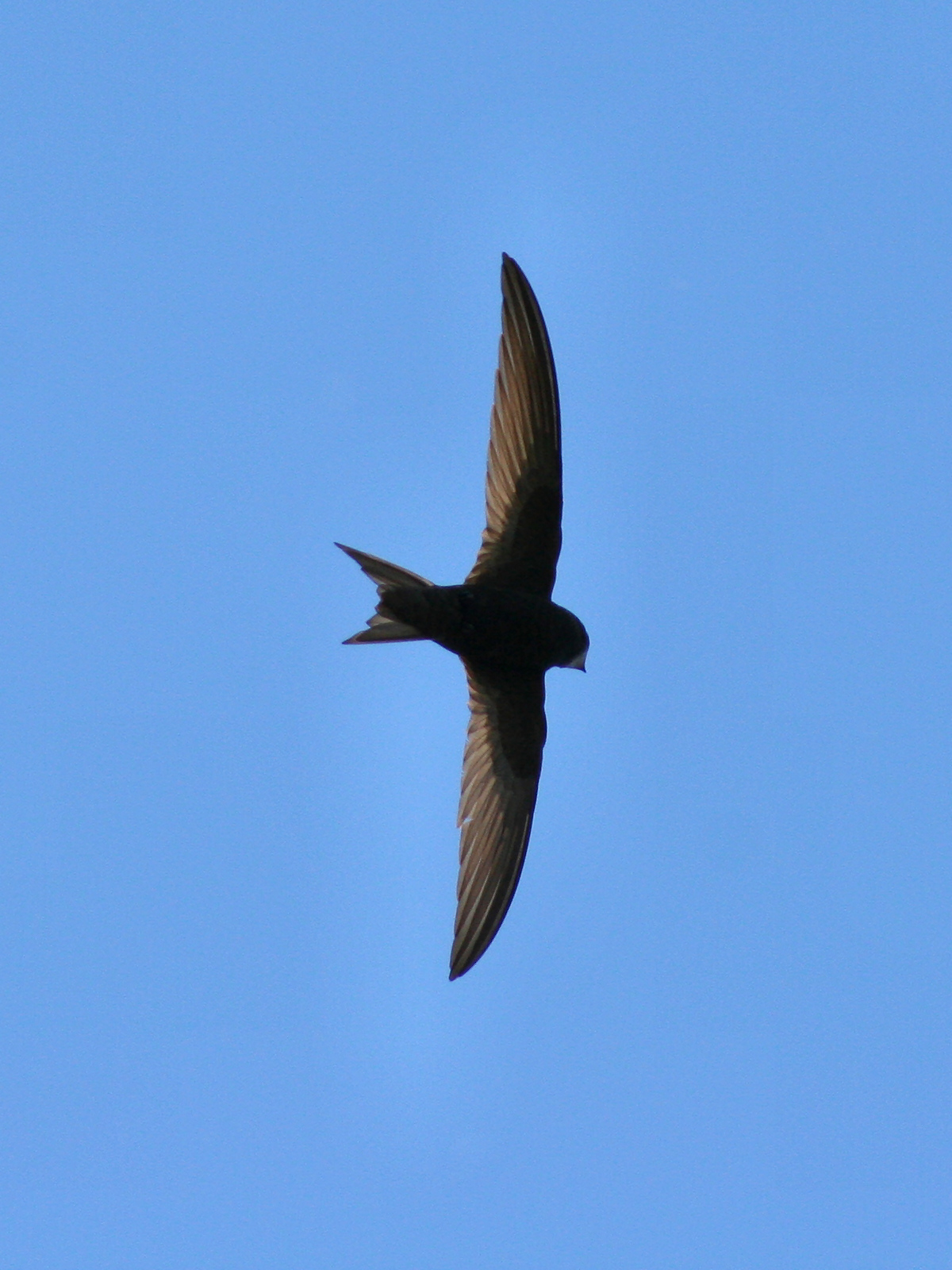
Common swift, a very common summer visitor.

Order: Caprimulgiformes Family: Apodidae

Swifts are small birds which spend the majority of their lives flying. These birds have very short legs and never settle voluntarily on the ground, perching instead only on vertical surfaces. Many swifts have long swept-back wings which resemble a crescent or boomerang.

- Alpine swift, Tachymarptis melba (A)
- Common swift, Apus apus (A)
- Pallid swift, Apus pallidus (A)
- Little swift, Apus affinis (A)
- White-rumped swift, Apus caffer (A)

== Bustards ==
Order: Otidiformes Family: Otididae

Bustards are large terrestrial birds mainly associated with dry open country and steppes in the Old World. They are omnivorous and nest on the ground. They walk steadily on strong legs and big toes, pecking for food as they go. They have long broad wings with "fingered" wingtips and striking patterns in flight. Many have interesting mating displays.

- Great bustard, Otis tarda (A)

== Cuckoos ==
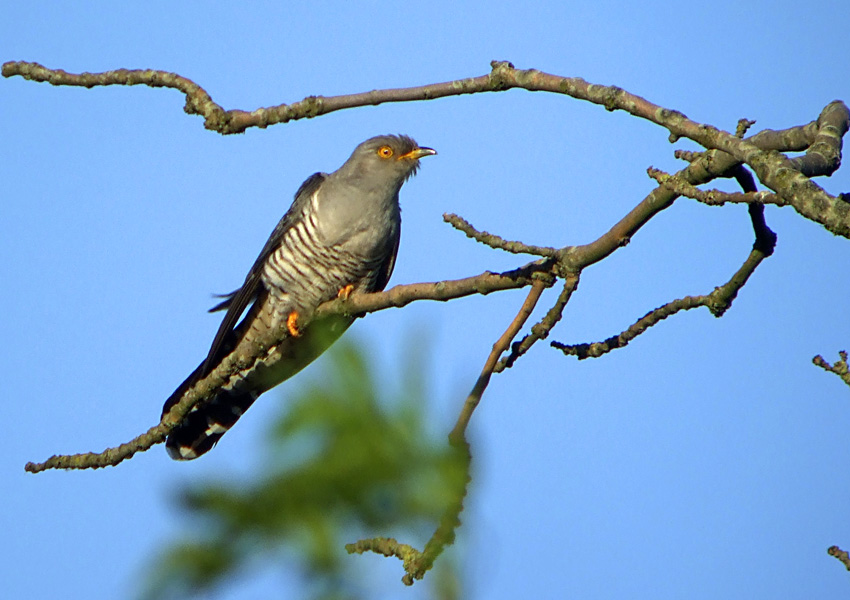
Common cuckoo, an occasional passage migrant.

Order: Cuculiformes Family: Cuculidae

The family Cuculidae includes cuckoos and allies. These are birds of variable sizes with slender bodies, long tails and strong legs.

- Great spotted cuckoo, Clamator glandarius (A)
- Common cuckoo, Cuculus canorus (A)

== Sandgrouse ==
Order: Pterocliformes Family: Pteroclidae

Sandgrouse have small, pigeon like heads and necks, but sturdy compact bodies. They have long pointed wings and sometimes tails and a fast direct flight. Flocks fly to watering holes at dawn and dusk. Their legs are feathered down to the toes.

- Pin-tailed sandgrouse, Pterocles alchata (A)

== Pigeons and doves ==
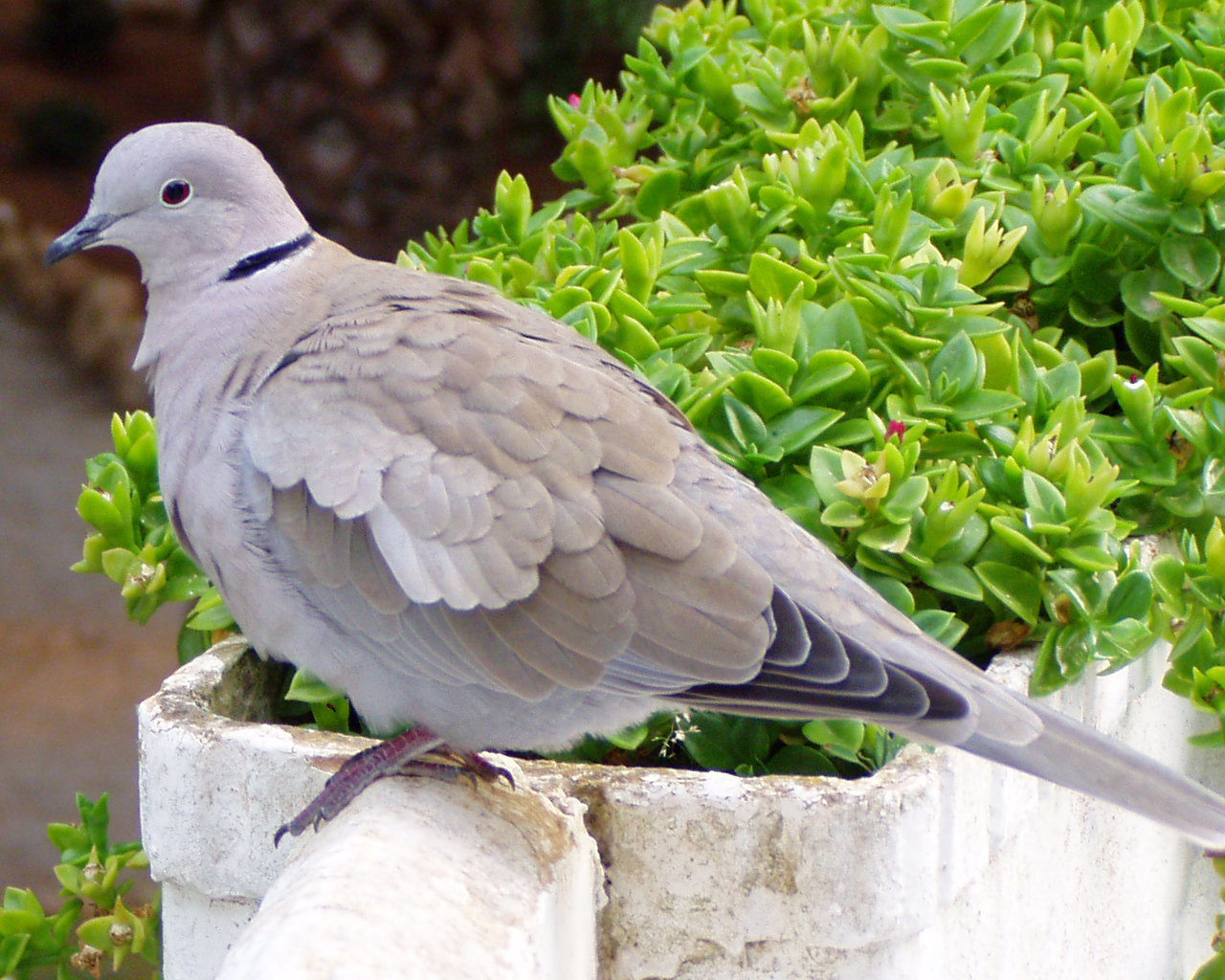
Eurasian collared dove, a recent colonist which is now common.

Order: Columbiformes Family: Columbidae

Pigeons and doves are stout-bodied birds with short necks and short slender bills with a fleshy cere.

- Rock dove, Columba livia (A; mostly feral pigeons)
- Stock dove, Columba oenas (A)
- Common wood pigeon, Columba palumbus (A)
- European turtle dove, Streptopelia turtur (A)
- Eurasian collared dove, Streptopelia decaocto (A)

== Rails, gallinules, and coots ==
Order: Gruiformes Family: Rallidae

Rallidae is a large family of small to medium-sized birds which include the rails, crakes, coots and gallinules. Typically they inhabit dense vegetation in damp environments near lakes, swamps or rivers. In general they are shy and secretive birds, making them difficult to observe. Most species have strong legs and long toes which are well adapted to soft uneven surfaces. They tend to have short, rounded wings and to be weak fliers.

- Corn crake, Crex crex (A)
- Common moorhen, Gallinula chloropus (A)
- Eurasian coot, Fulica atra (B)
- Western swamphen, Porphyrio porphyrio (A)
- Allen's gallinule, Porphyrio alleni (A)
- Baillon's crake, Zapornia pusilla (A)

== Cranes ==
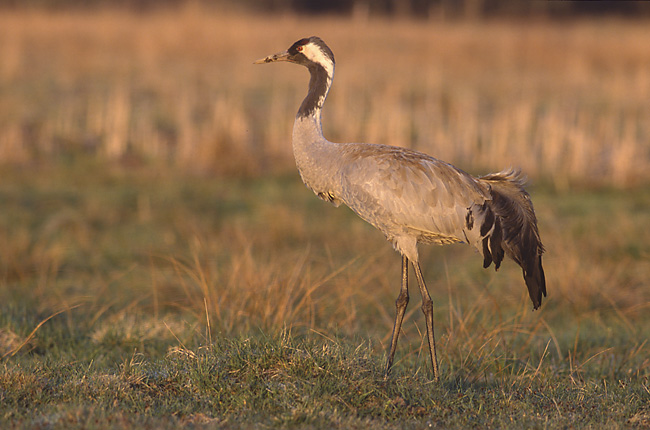
Common crane, occasional on migration.

Order: Gruiformes Family: Gruidae

Cranes are large, long-legged and long-necked birds. Unlike the similar-looking but unrelated herons, cranes fly with necks outstretched, not pulled back. Most have elaborate and noisy courting displays or "dances".

- Common crane, Grus grus (A)

== Grebes ==
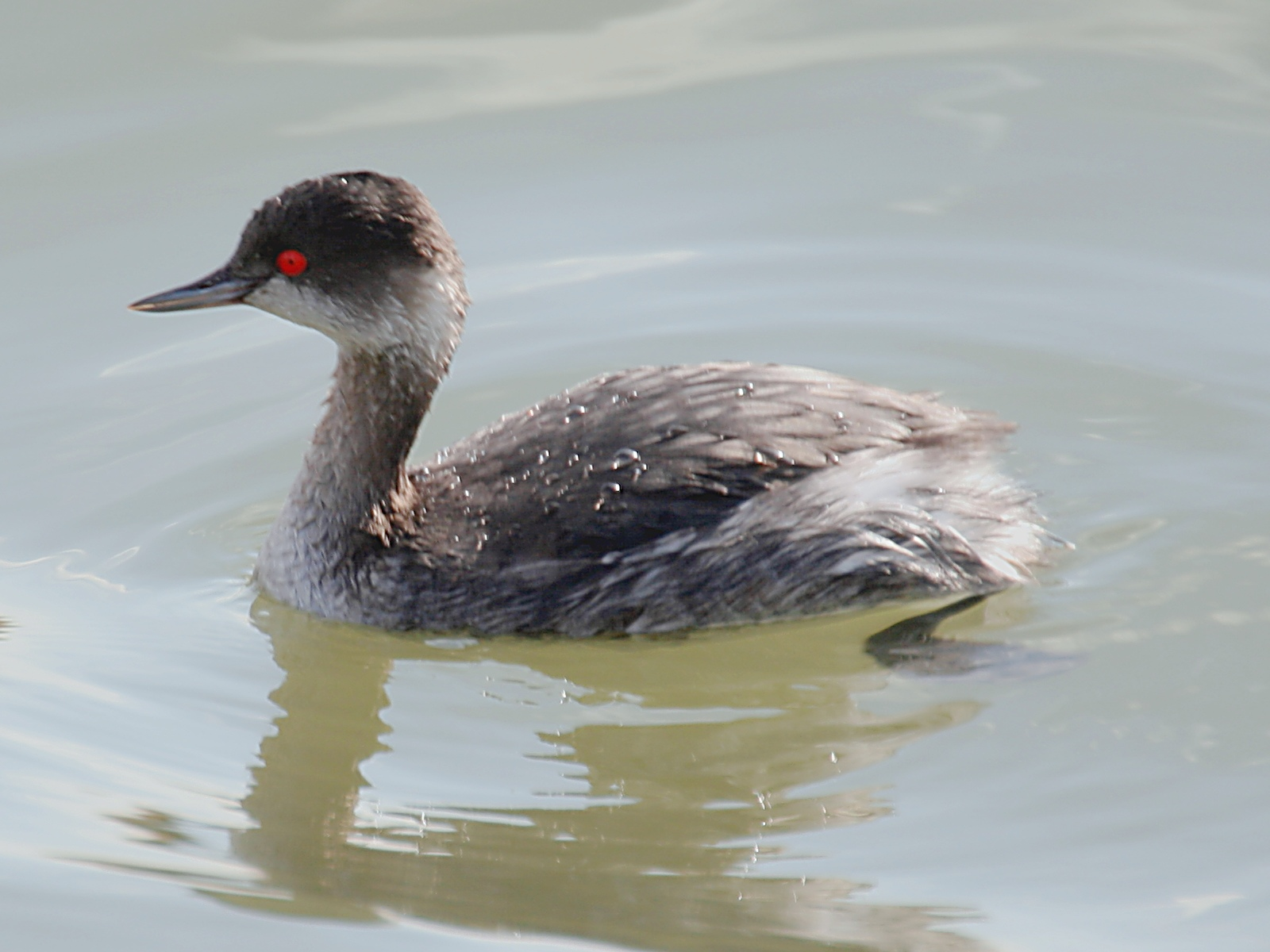
Black-necked grebe, an occasional winter visitor.

Order: Podicipediformes Family: Podicipedidae

Grebes are small to medium-large freshwater diving birds. They have lobed toes and are excellent swimmers and divers. However, they have their feet placed far back on the body, making them quite ungainly on land.

- Little grebe, Tachybaptus ruficollis (A)
- Black-necked grebe, Podiceps nigricollis (A)

== Flamingos ==
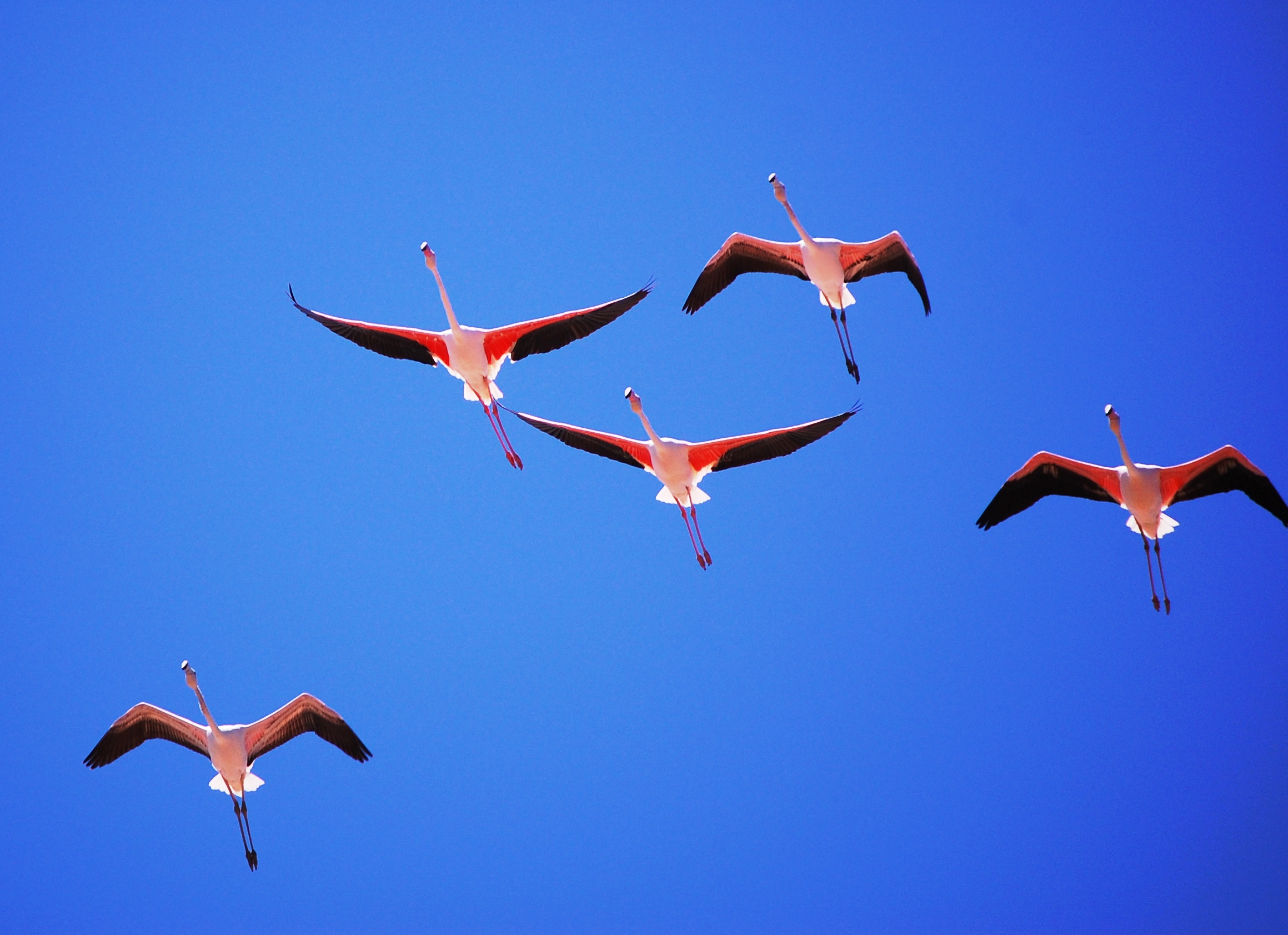
Greater flamingo, irregular on passage.

Order: Phoenicopteriformes Family: Phoenicopteridae

Flamingos are gregarious wading birds, found in both the Western and Eastern Hemispheres. Flamingos filter-feed on shellfish and algae. Their oddly shaped beaks are specially adapted to separate mud and silt from the food they consume and, uniquely, are used upside-down.

- Greater flamingo, Phoenicopterus roseus (A)

== Stone-curlews ==
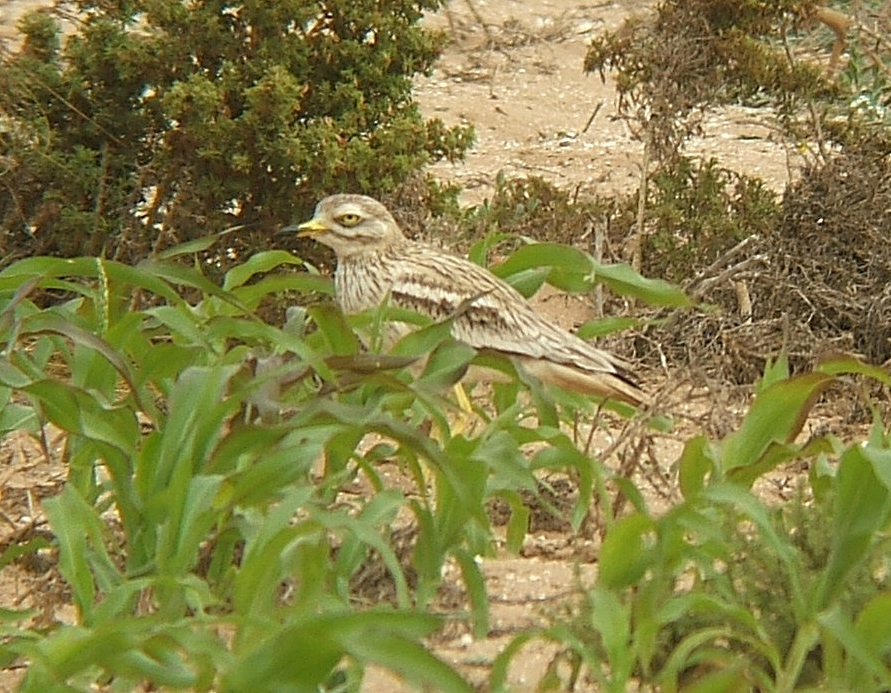
Eurasian thick-knee, occasional passage migrant.

Order: Charadriiformes Family: Burhinidae

The stone-curlews and thick-knees are a group of largely tropical waders in the family Burhinidae. They are found worldwide within the tropical zone, with some species also breeding in temperate Europe and Australia. They are medium to large waders with strong black or yellow-black bills, large yellow eyes and cryptic plumage. Despite being classed as waders, most species have a preference for arid or semi-arid habitats.

- Eurasian stone-curlew, Burhinus oedicnemus (A)

== Oystercatchers ==
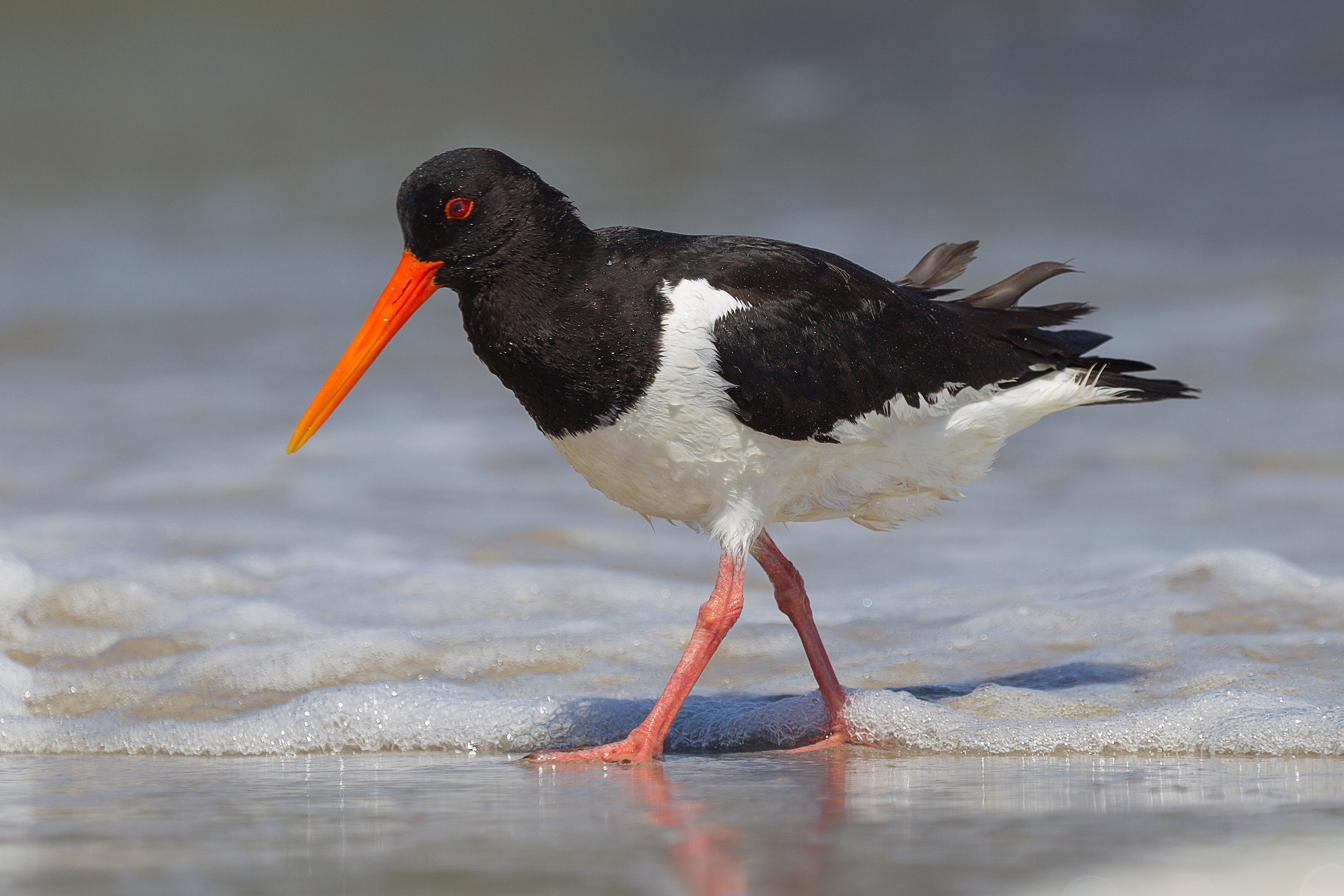
Eurasian oystercatcher, an occasional migrant.

Order: Charadriiformes Family: Haematopodidae

The oystercatchers are large and noisy plover-like birds, with strong orange-red bills used for smashing or prising open molluscs.

- Eurasian oystercatcher, Haematopus ostralegus (A)

== Stilts and avocets ==
Order: Charadriiformes Family: Recurvirostridae

Recurvirostridae is a family of large wading birds, which includes the avocets and stilts. The avocets have long legs and long up-curved bills. The stilts have extremely long legs and long, thin, straight bills.

- Pied avocet, Recurvirostra avosetta (A)
- Black-winged stilt, Himantopus himantopus (A)

== Plovers and lapwings ==
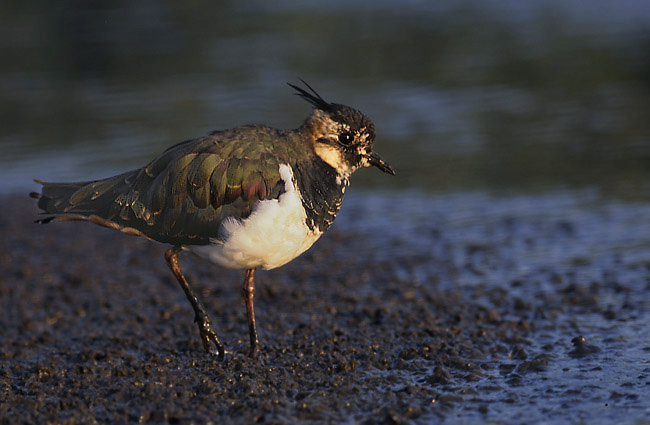
Northern lapwing, an irregular winter visitor.

Order: Charadriiformes Family: Charadriidae

The family Charadriidae includes the plovers, dotterels and lapwings. They are small to medium-sized birds with compact bodies, short, thick necks and long, usually pointed, wings. They are found in open country worldwide, mostly in habitats near water.

- Northern lapwing, Vanellus vanellus (A)
- European golden plover, Pluvialis apricaria (A)
- Grey plover, Pluvialis squatarola (A)
- Common ringed plover, Charadrius hiaticula (A)
- Little ringed plover, Charadrius dubius (A)
- Kentish plover, Charadrius alexandrinus (A)

== Sandpipers and allies ==
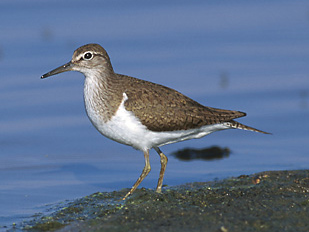
Common sandpiper, a passage migrant which sometimes overwinters.

Order: Charadriiformes Family: Scolopacidae

Scolopacidae is a large diverse family of small to medium-sized shorebirds including the sandpipers, curlews, godwits, shanks, tattlers, woodcocks, snipes, dowitchers and phalaropes. The majority of these species eat small invertebrates picked out of the mud or soil. Variation in length of legs and bills enables multiple species to feed in the same habitat, particularly on the coast, without direct competition for food.

- Eurasian whimbrel, Numenius phaeopus (A)
- Eurasian curlew, Numenius arquata (A)
- Bar-tailed godwit, Limosa lapponica (A)
- Black-tailed godwit, Limosa limosa (A)
- Ruddy turnstone, Arenaria interpres
- Red knot, Calidris canutus (A)
- Curlew sandpiper, Calidris ferruginea (A)
- Sanderling, Calidris alba (A)
- Dunlin, Calidris alpina (A)
- Purple sandpiper, Calidris maritima (A)
- Little stint, Calidris minuta (A)
- Eurasian woodcock, Scolopax rusticola (A)
- Jack snipe, Lymnocryptes minimus (A)
- Common snipe, Gallinago gallinago (A)
- Red-necked phalarope, Phalaropus lobatus (B)
- Grey phalarope, Phalaropus fulicarius (A)
- Common sandpiper, Actitis hypoleucos (A)
- Green sandpiper, Tringa ochropus (A)
- Common redshank, Tringa totanus (A)
- Wood sandpiper, Tringa glareola (A)

== Pratincoles and coursers ==
Order: Charadriiformes Family: Glareolidae

Glareolidae is a family of wading birds comprising the pratincoles, which have short legs, long pointed wings and long forked tails, and the coursers, which have longer legs, shorter wings and longer pointed bills which curve downwards.

- Collared pratincole, Glareola pratincola (A)

== Gulls, terns, and skimmers ==
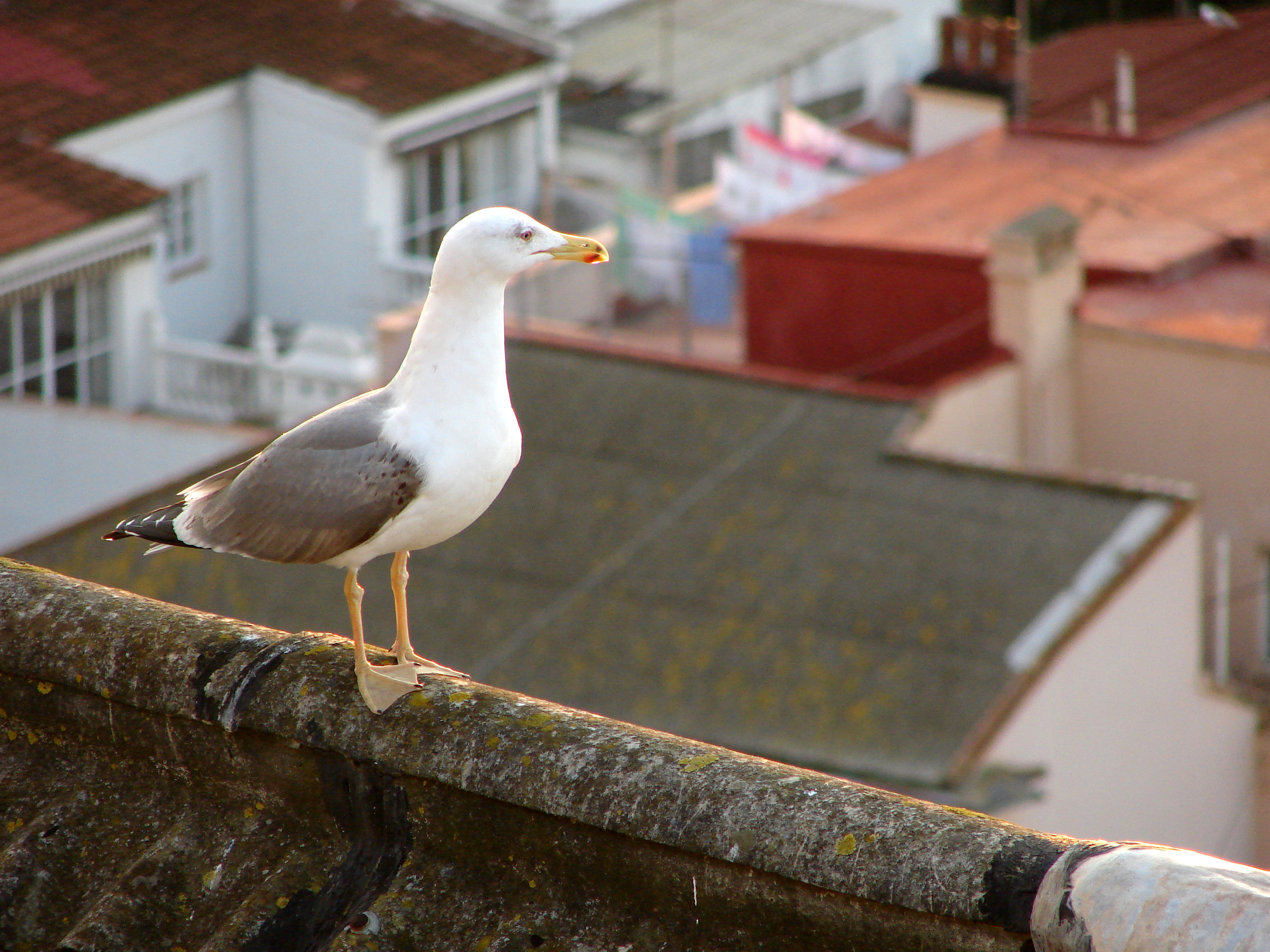
A yellow-legged gull (Larus michahellis) on a rooftop in Gibraltar

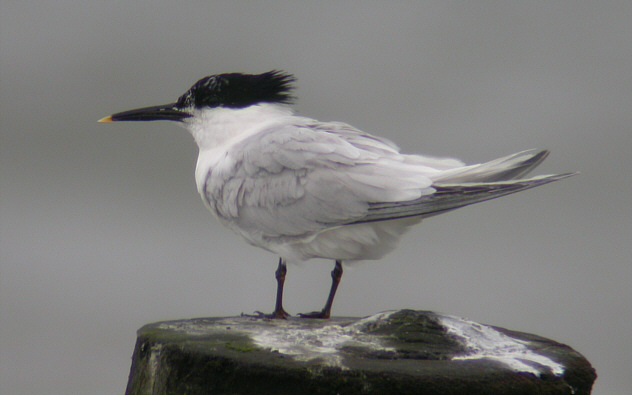
Sandwich tern, regularly seen offshore.

Order: Charadriiformes Family: Laridae

Laridae is a family of medium to large seabirds that includes gulls and terns. Gulls are typically grey or white, often with black markings on the head or wings. They have stout, longish bills and webbed feet. Terns are a group of generally small to medium-size seabirds typically with grey or white plumage, often with black markings on the head. Most terns hunt fish by diving but some pick insects off the surface of fresh water. Both are generally long-lived birds, with several species known to live in excess of 30 years.

- Black-legged kittiwake, Rissa tridactyla (A)
- Sabine's gull, Xema sabini (A)
- Slender-billed gull, Chroicocephalus genei (A)
- Black-headed gull, Chroicocephalus ridibundus
- Grey-headed gull, Chroicocephalus cirrocephalus (A)
- Little gull, Hydrocoloeus minutus (A)
- Laughing gull, Leucophaeus atricilla (A)
- Mediterranean gull, Ichthyaetus melanocephalus (A)
- Audouin's gull, Ichthyaetus audouinii (A)
- Common gull, Larus canus (A)
- Ring-billed gull, Larus delawarensis (A)
- Great black-backed gull, Larus marinus (A)
- Iceland gull, Larus glaucoides (A)
- European herring gull, Larus argentatus (A)
- Yellow-legged gull, Larus michahellis (A)
- Lesser black-backed gull, Larus fuscus (A)
- Gull-billed tern, Gelochelidon nilotica (A)
- Caspian tern, Hydroprogne caspia (A)
- Lesser crested tern, Thalasseus bengalensis (A)
- West African crested tern, Thalasseus albididorsalis (A)
- Sandwich tern, Thalasseus sandvicensis (A)
- Little tern, Sternula albifrons (A)
- Roseate tern, Sterna dougallii (A)
- Common tern, Sterna hirundo (A)
- Arctic tern, Sterna paradisaea (A)
- Whiskered tern, Chlidonias hybrida (A)
- White-winged tern, Chlidonias leucopterus (A)
- Black tern, Chlidonias niger (A)

== Skuas ==
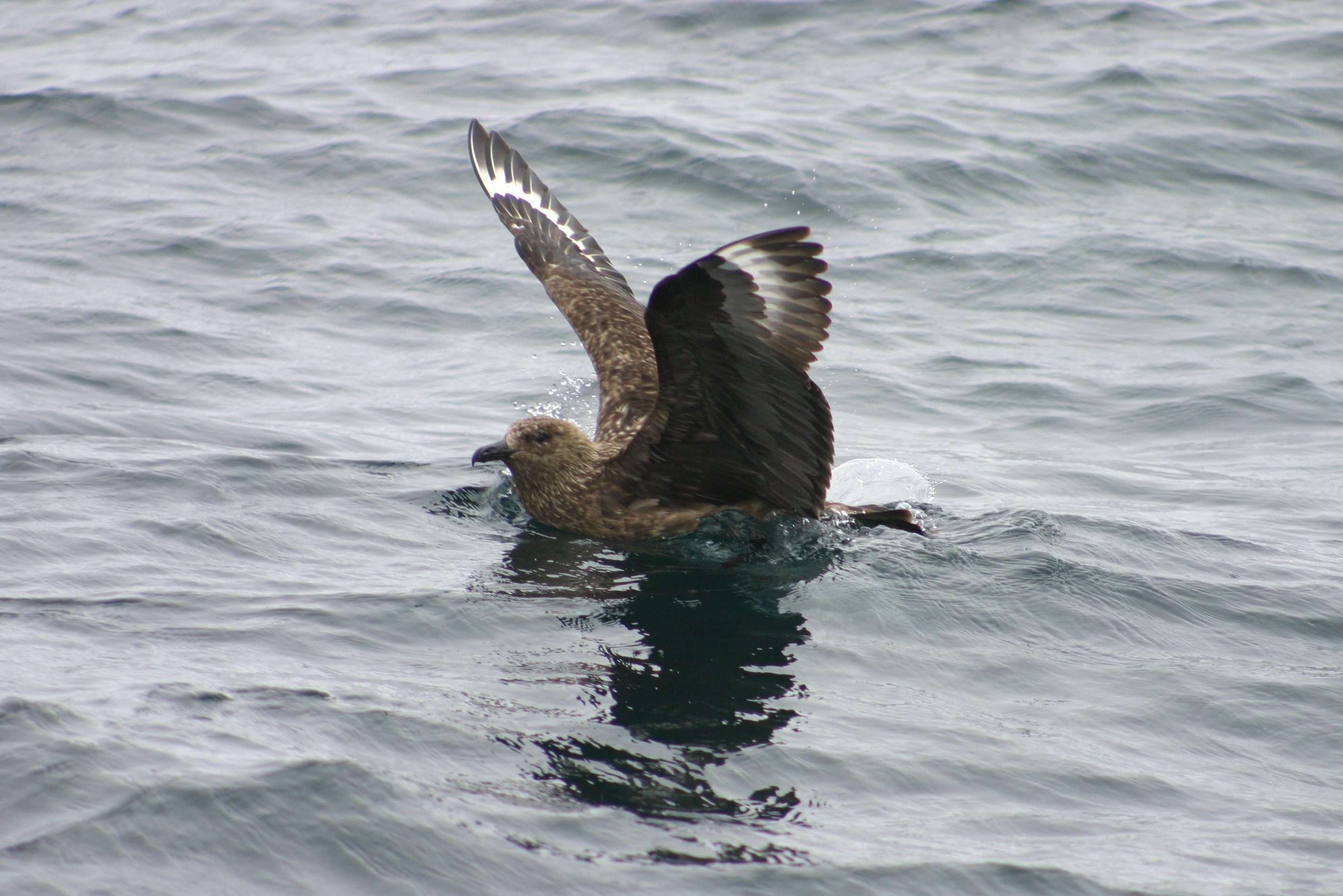
Great skua, common offshore.

Order: Charadriiformes Family: Stercorariidae

Skuas are, in general, medium to large birds, typically with grey or brown plumage, often with white markings on the wings. They nest on the ground in temperate and arctic regions and are long-distance migrants. Much of their food is obtained by piracy, robbing other seabirds of their catches. Some species are also called 'jaegers' in North America.

- Great skua, Stercorarius skua
- Arctic skua, Stercorarius parasiticus
- Pomarine skua, Stercorarius pomarinus (A)

== Auks, guillemots, and puffins ==
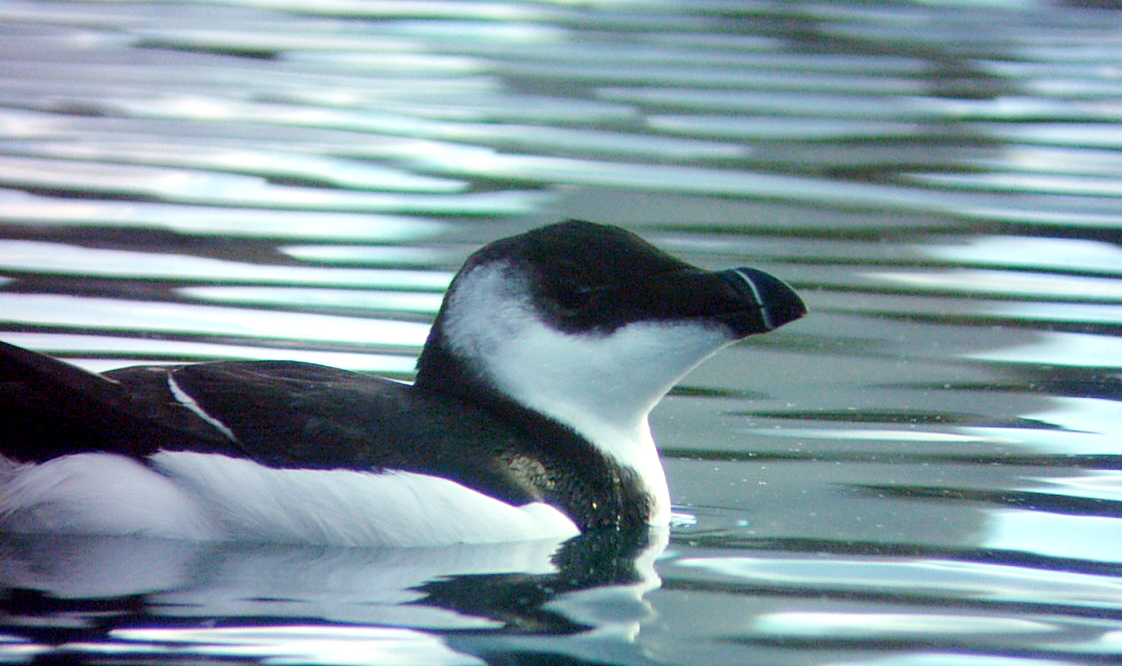
Razorbill, common at sea in winter.

Order: Charadriiformes Family: Alcidae

Alcids are superficially similar to penguins due to their black-and-white plumage, their upright posture and some of their habits, however they are not related to the penguins and differ in being able to fly. Auks live on the open sea, only deliberately coming ashore to nest.

- Little auk, Alle alle (A)
- Common guillemot, Uria aalge (A)
- Razorbill, Alca torda (A)
- Atlantic puffin, Fratercula arctica (A)

== Divers ==
Order: Gaviiformes Family: Gaviidae

Divers, known as loons in North America, are a group of aquatic birds found in many parts of northern Eurasia and North America. They are the size of a large duck or small goose, but to which they are completely unrelated.

- Red-throated diver, Gavia stellata (A)
- Black-throated diver, Gavia arctica (B)
- Great northern diver, Gavia immer (A)

== Northern storm petrels ==
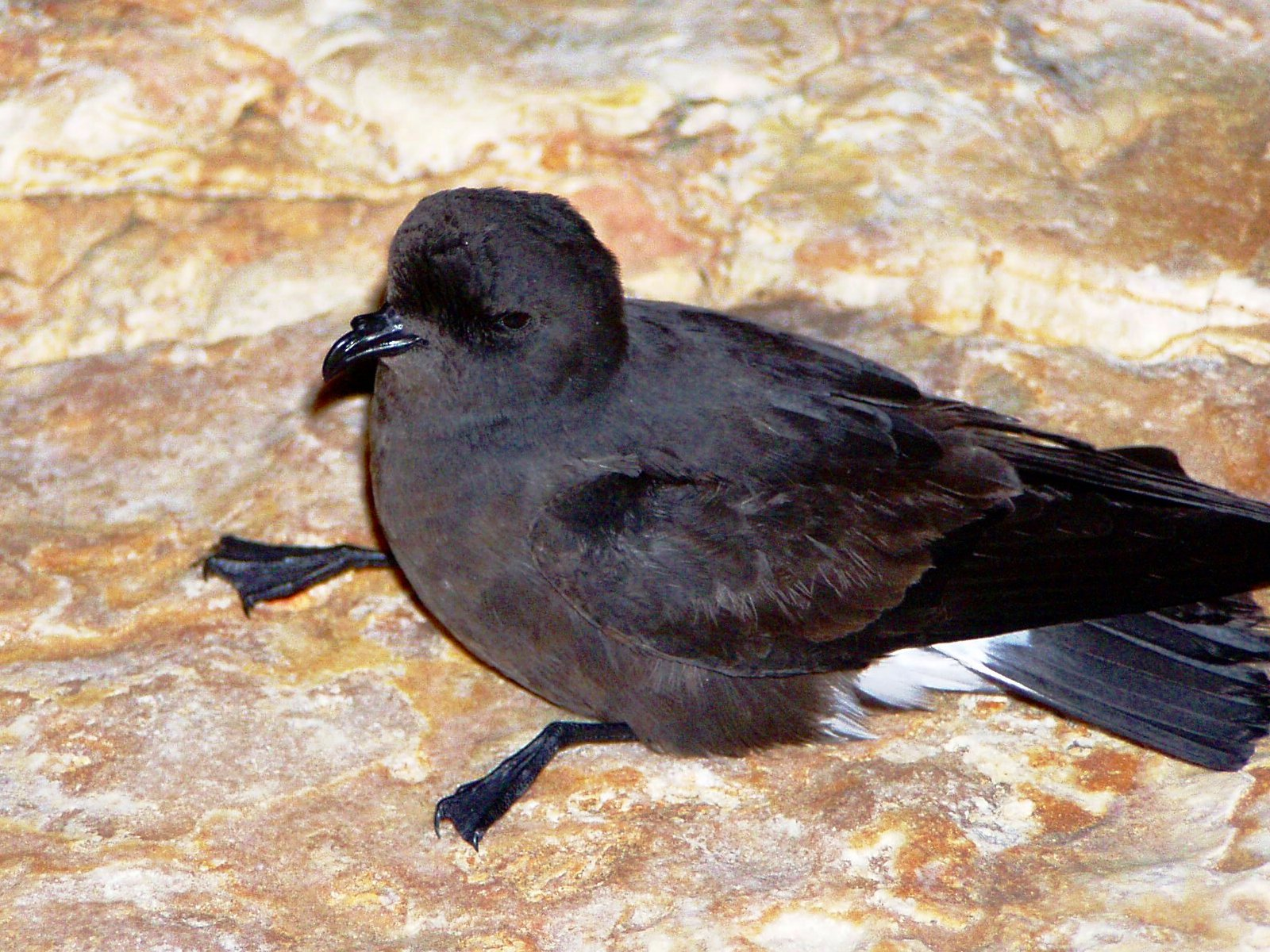
European storm petrel, present offshore during the summer.

Order: Procellariiformes Family: Hydrobatidae

The northern storm petrels are a family of petrels, and are the smallest seabirds. They feed on planktonic crustaceans and small fish picked from the surface, typically while hovering. The flight is fluttering and sometimes bat-like.

- European storm petrel, Hydrobates pelagicus
- Leach's storm petrel, Hydrobates leucorhous

== Shearwaters and petrels ==
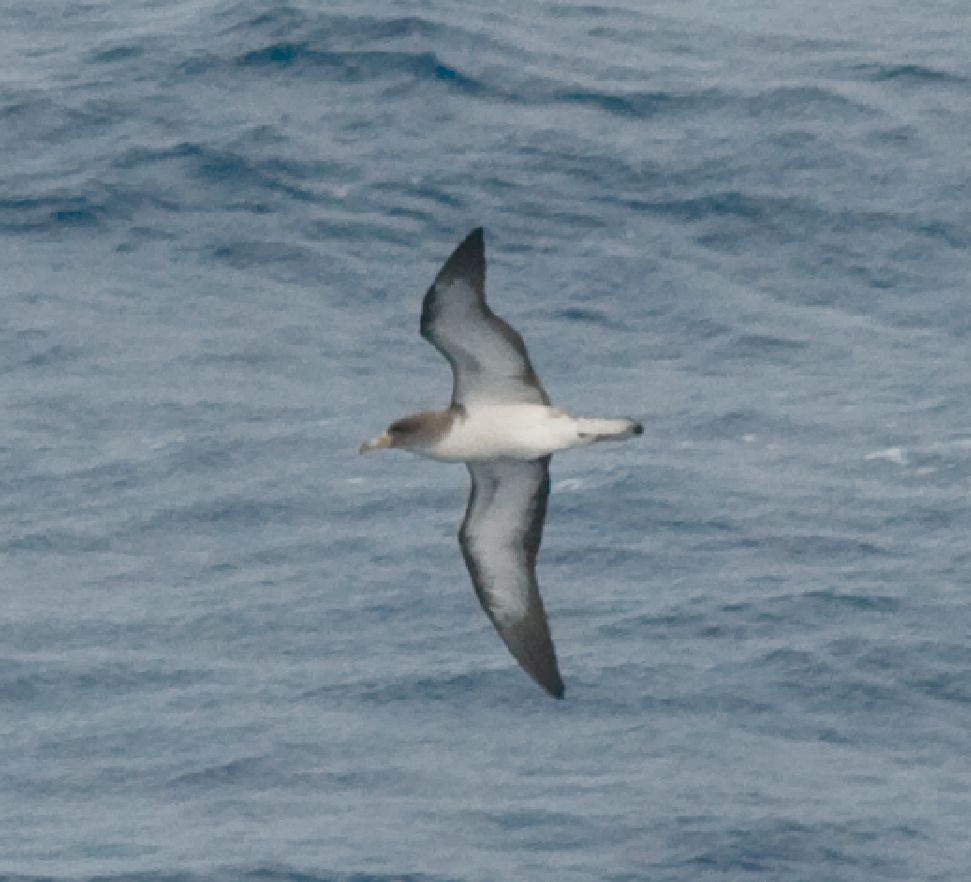
Cory's shearwater, can occur in large numbers offshore.

Order: Procellariiformes Family: Procellariidae

The procellariids are the main group of medium-sized petrels, characterised by united nostrils with medium septum and a long outer functional primary.

- Cape petrel, Daption capense (A)
- Scopoli's shearwater, Calonectris diomedea (A)
- Cory's shearwater, Calonectris borealis (A)
- Sooty shearwater, Ardenna griseus (A)
- Great shearwater, Ardenna gravis (A)
- Yelkouan shearwater, Puffinus yelkouan (A)
- Balearic shearwater, Puffinus mauretanicus (A)
- Barolo shearwater, Puffinus baroli (A)

== Storks ==
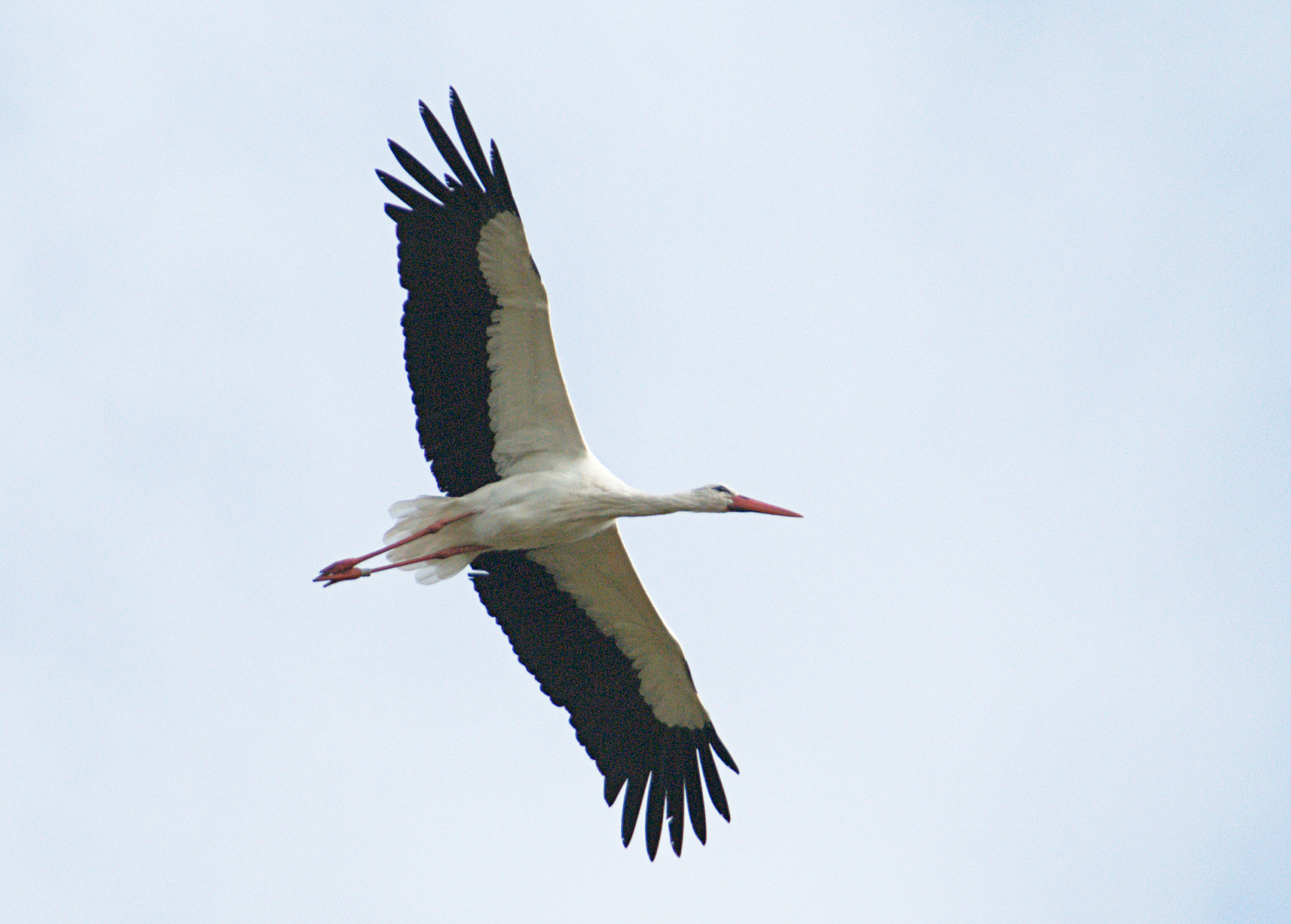
White stork, large flocks migrate across the straits.

Order: Ciconiiformes Family: Ciconiidae

Storks are large, long-legged, long-necked, wading birds with long stout bills. Storks are mute, but bill-clattering is an important mode of communication at the nest. Their nests can be large and may be reused for many years. Many species are migratory.

- Black stork, Ciconia nigra (A)
- White stork, Ciconia ciconia (A)

== Boobies and gannets ==
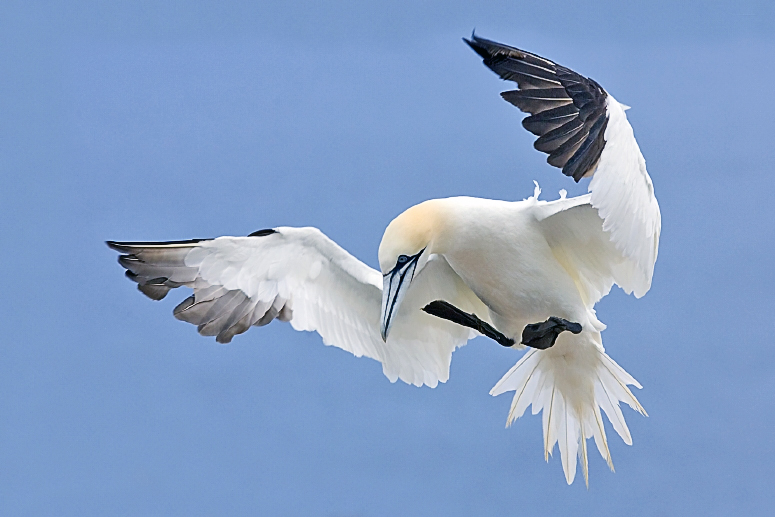
Northern gannet, regular offshore.

Order: Suliformes Family: Sulidae

The sulids comprise the gannets and boobies. Both are medium to large coastal seabirds that plunge-dive for fish..

- Northern gannet, Morus bassanus (A)

== Cormorants and shags ==
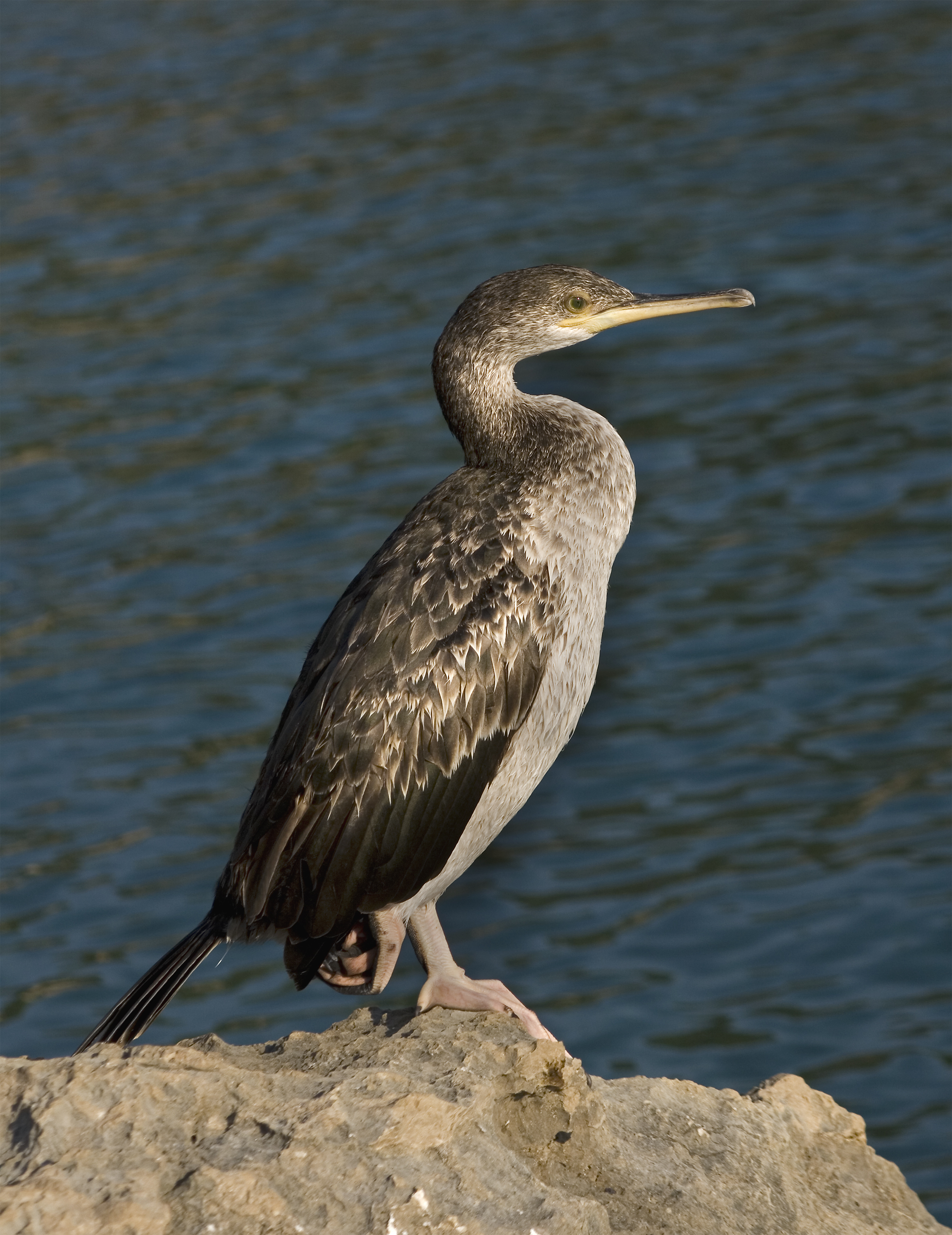
European shag, a small population breeds on sea cliffs.

Order: Suliformes Family: Phalacrocoracidae

Phalacrocoracidae is a family of medium to large coastal, fish-eating seabirds that includes cormorants and shags. The majority have mainly dark plumage, some species being black-and-white; many show some plumage iridescence, and many have brightly coloured eyes.

- Great cormorant, Phalacrocorax carbo (A)
- European shag, Gulosus aristotelis (A)

== Ibises and spoonbills ==
Order: Pelecaniformes Family: Threskiornithidae

Threskiornithidae is a family of large terrestrial and wading birds which includes the ibises and spoonbills. They have long, broad wings with 11 primary and about 20 secondary feathers. They are strong fliers and despite their size and weight, very capable soarers.

- Glossy ibis, Plegadis falcinellus (A)
- Eurasian spoonbill, Platalea leucorodia (A)

== Herons, egrets, and bitterns ==
Order: Pelecaniformes Family: Ardeidae

The family Ardeidae contains the bitterns, herons, and egrets. Herons and egrets are medium to large wading birds with long necks and legs. Bitterns tend to have shorter necks and be more wary. Members of Ardeidae fly with their necks retracted, unlike other long-necked birds such as storks, ibises and spoonbills.

- Little bittern, Ixobrychus minutus (A)
- Black-crowned night heron, Nycticorax nycticorax (A)
- Squacco heron, Ardeola ralloides (A)
- Cattle egret, Bubulcus ibis (A)
- Grey heron, Ardea cinerea (A)
- Purple heron, Ardea purpurea (A)
- Great egret, Ardea alba (A)
- Little egret, Egretta garzetta (A)

== Osprey ==
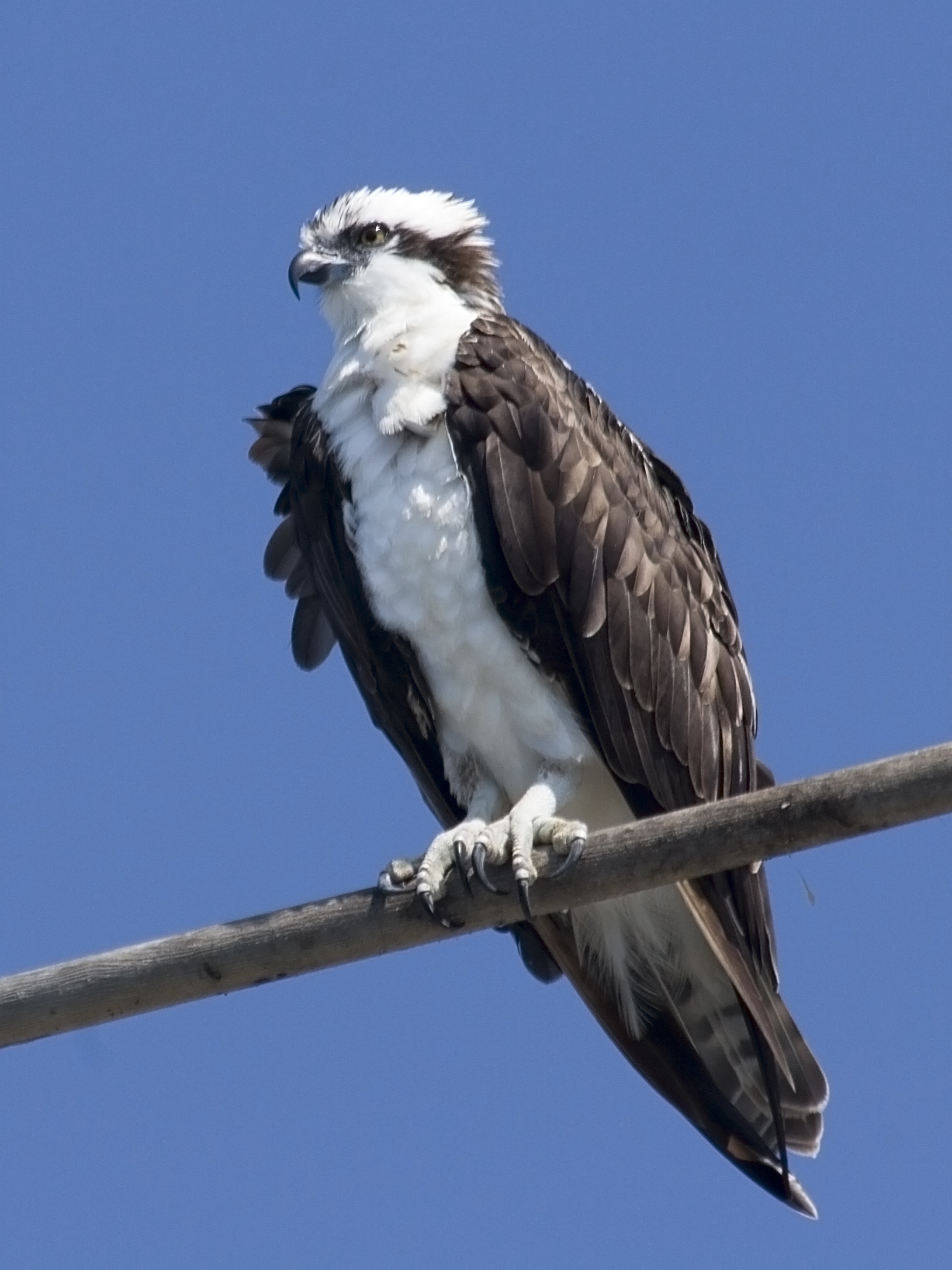
Osprey, a regular migrant.

Order: Accipitriformes Family: Pandionidae

The family Pandionidae contains only one species, the osprey. The osprey is a medium-large raptor which is a specialist fish-eater with a worldwide distribution.

- Osprey, Pandion haliaetus (A)

== Hawks, eagles, and kites ==
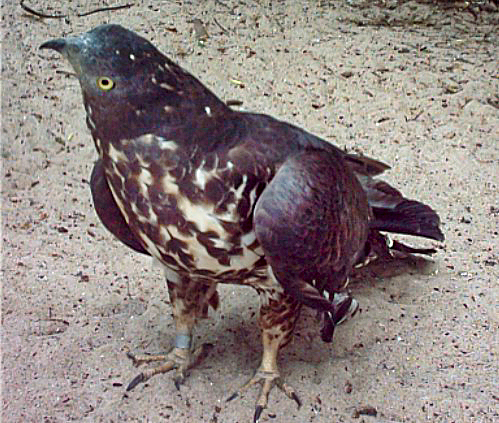
European honey buzzard. Large numbers pass over in spring and autumn.

Order: Accipitriformes Family: Accipitridae

Accipitridae is a family of birds of prey, which includes hawks, eagles, kites, harriers and Old World vultures. These birds have powerful hooked beaks for tearing flesh from their prey, strong legs, powerful talons and keen eyesight.

- Black-winged kite, Elanus caeruleus (A)
- Bearded vulture, Gypaetus barbatus (A)
- Egyptian vulture, Neophron percnopterus (A)
- European honey buzzard, Pernis apivorus (A)
- Rüppell's vulture, Gyps ruepelli (A)
- Griffon vulture, Gyps fulvus (A)
- Eurasian black vulture, Aegypius monachus (A)
- Short-toed snake-eagle, Circaetus gallicus (A)
- Lesser spotted eagle, Clanga pomarina (A)
- Greater spotted eagle, Clanga clanga (A)
- Booted eagle, Hieraaetus pennatus (A)
- Steppe eagle, Aquila nipalensis (A)
- Spanish imperial eagle, Aquila adalberti (A)
- Golden eagle, Aquila chrysaetos (A)
- Bonelli's eagle, Aquila fasciata (A)
- Eurasian goshawk, Accipiter gentilis (A)
- Eurasian sparrowhawk, Accipiter nisus (A)
- Eurasian marsh harrier, Circus aeruginosus (A)
- Hen harrier, Circus cyaneus (A)
- Pallid harrier, Circus macrourus (A)
- Montagu's harrier, Circus pygargus (A)
- Red kite, Milvus milvus (A)
- Black kite, Milvus migrans (A)
- Long-legged buzzard, Buteo rufinus (A)
- Common buzzard, Buteo buteo (A)

== Barn owls ==
Order: Strigiformes Family: Tytonidae

Barn owls are medium to large owls with large heads and characteristic heart-shaped faces. They have long strong legs with powerful talons.

- Western barn owl, Tyto alba

== Owls ==
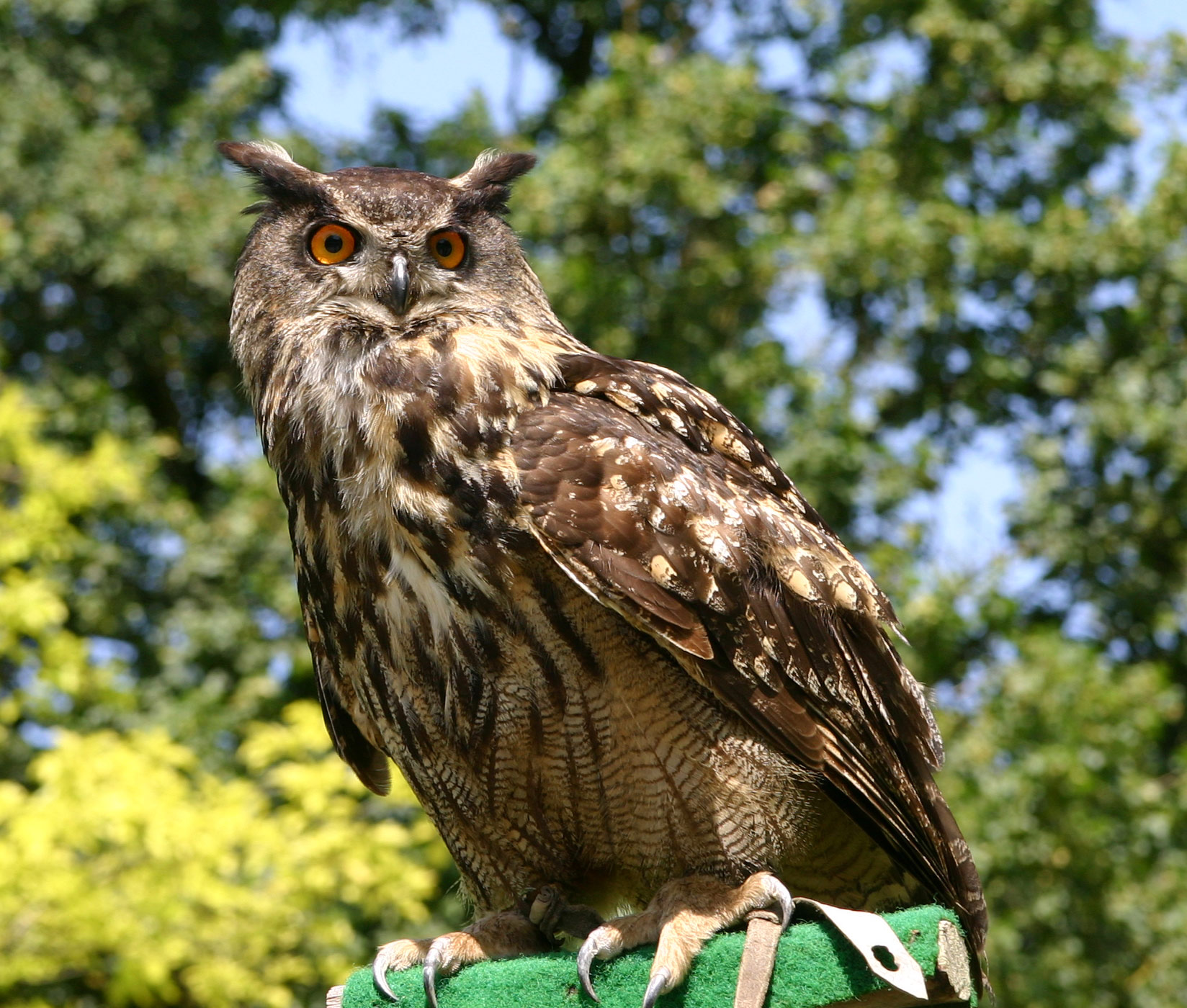
Eurasian eagle-owl, has recently returned as a breeding bird.

Order: Strigiformes Family: Strigidae

The typical owls are small to large solitary nocturnal birds of prey. They have large forward-facing eyes and ears, a hawk-like beak and a conspicuous circle of feathers around each eye called a facial disk.

- Little owl, Athene noctua (A)
- Eurasian scops owl, Otus scops (A)
- Long-eared owl, Asio otus (A)
- Short-eared owl, Asio flammeus (A)
- Tawny owl, Strix aluco (A)
- Eurasian eagle-owl, Bubo bubo (A)

== Hoopoes ==
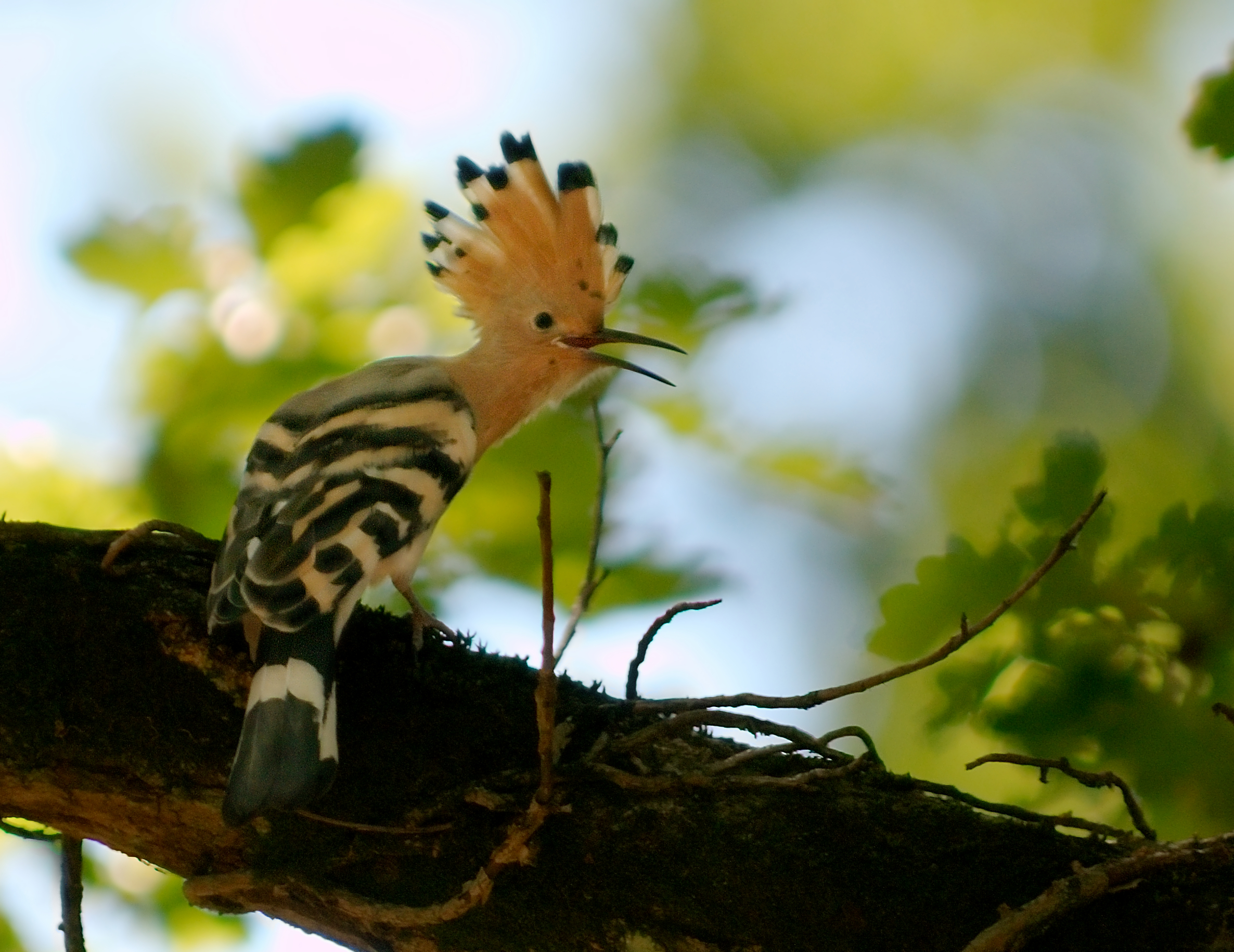
Eurasian hoopoe, common on passage.

Order: Bucerotiformes Family: Upupidae

Hoopoes have black, white and orangey-pink colouring with a large erectile crest on their head.

- Eurasian hoopoe, Upupa epops (A)

== Rollers ==
Order: Coraciiformes Family: Coraciidae

Rollers resemble crows in size and build, but are more closely related to the kingfishers and bee-eaters. They share the colourful appearance of those groups with blues and browns predominating. The two inner front toes are connected, but the outer toe is not.

- European roller, Coracias garrulus (A)

== Kingfishers ==
Order: Coraciiformes Family: Alcedinidae

Kingfishers are medium-sized birds with large heads, long, pointed bills, short legs and stubby tails.

- Common kingfisher, Alcedo atthis (A)

== Bee-eaters ==
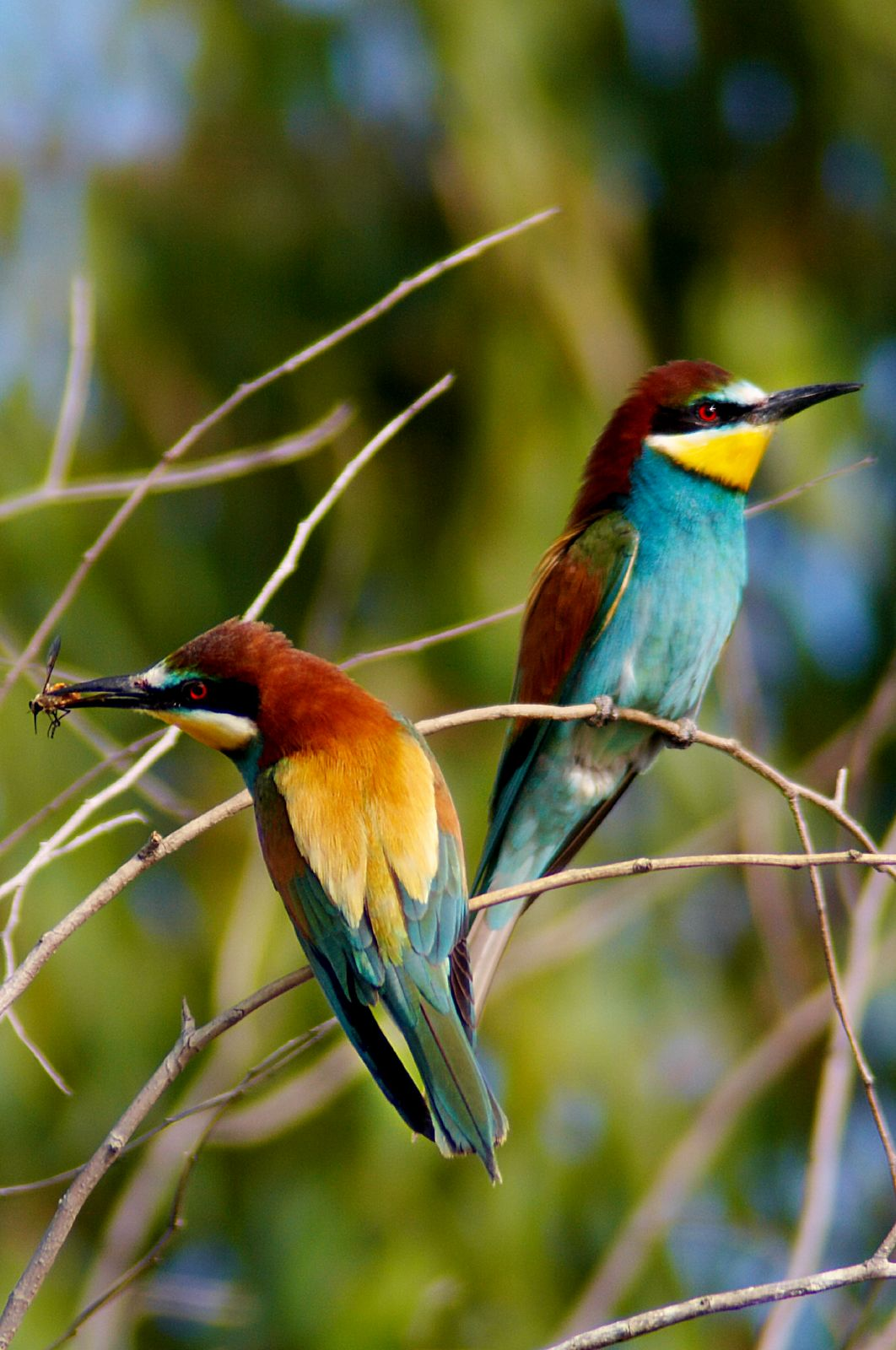
European bee-eater, common in spring and autumn.

Order: Coraciiformes Family: Meropidae

The bee-eaters are a group of coraciiform birds in the family Meropidae. Most species are found in Africa but others occur in southern Europe, Madagascar, Australia and New Guinea. They are characterised by richly coloured plumage, slender bodies and usually elongated central tail feathers. All are colourful and have long downturned bills and pointed wings, which give them a swallow-like appearance when seen from afar.

- Blue-cheeked bee-eater, Merops persicus (A)
- European bee-eater, Merops apiaster (A)

== Woodpeckers ==
Order: Piciformes Family: Picidae

Woodpeckers are small to medium-sized birds with chisel-like beaks, short legs, stiff tails and long tongues used for capturing insects. Some species have feet with two toes pointing forward and two backward, while several species have only three toes. Many woodpeckers have the habit of tapping noisily on tree trunks with their beaks.

- Eurasian wryneck, Jynx torquilla (A)
- Great spotted woodpecker, Dendrocopos major (A)
- Iberian green woodpecker, Picus sharpei (A)

== Falcons and caracaras ==
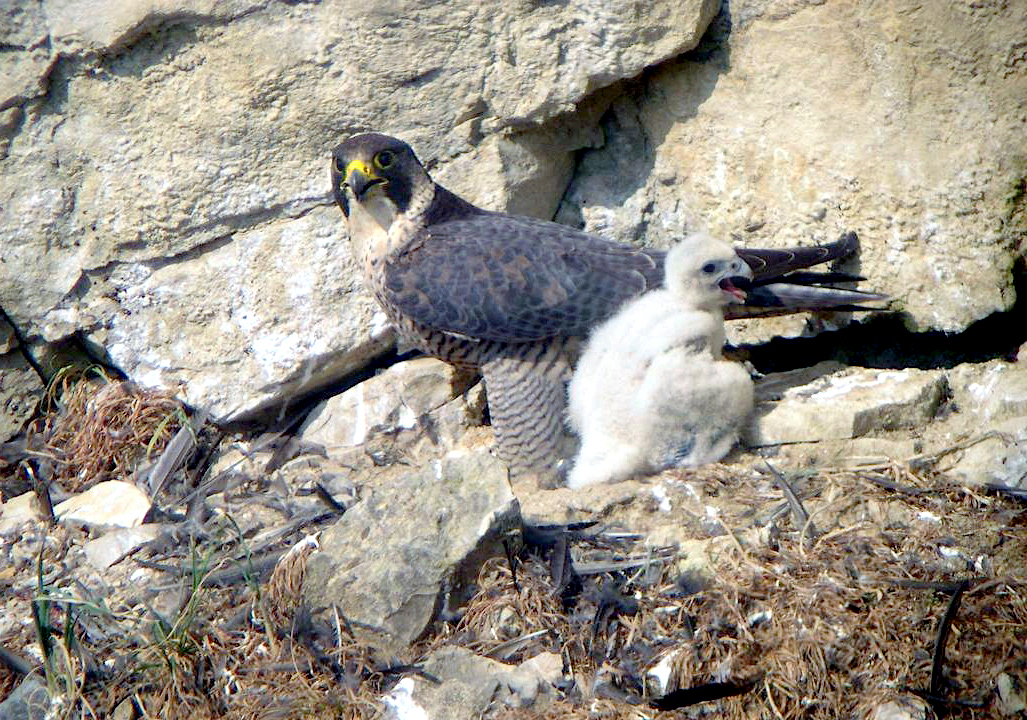
Peregrine falcon, a breeding resident.

Order: Falconiformes Family: Falconidae

Falconidae is a family of diurnal birds of prey. They differ from hawks, eagles and kites in that they have a tomial 'tooth' on their bill, and are genetically unrelated.

- Lesser kestrel, Falco naumanni (A)
- Eurasian kestrel, Falco tinnunculus (A)
- Red-footed falcon, Falco vespertinus (A)
- Eleonora's falcon, Falco eleonorae (A)
- Merlin, Falco columbarius (A)
- Eurasian hobby, Falco subbuteo (A)
- Lanner falcon, Falco biarmicus (A)
- Saker falcon, Falco cherrug (A)
- Peregrine falcon, Falco peregrinus (A)

== Shrikes ==
Order: Passeriformes Family: Laniidae

Shrikes are passerine birds known for their habit of catching other birds and small animals and impaling the uneaten portions of their bodies on thorns. A typical shrike's beak is hooked, like a bird of prey.

- Iberian grey shrike, Lanius meridionalis (A)
- Masked shrike, Lanius nubicus (B)
- Woodchat shrike, Lanius senator (A)
- Red-backed shrike, Lanius collurio (A)

== Old World orioles ==
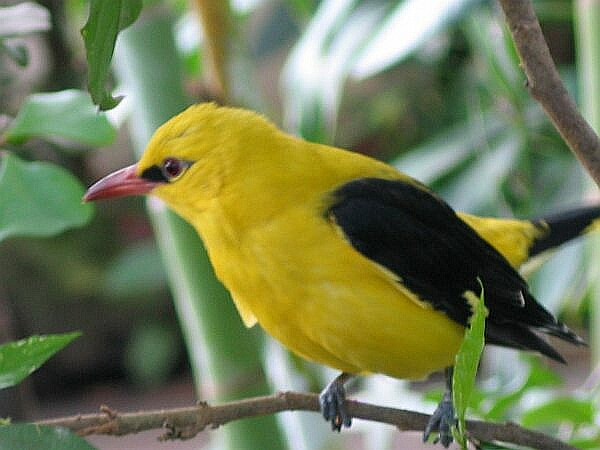
Golden oriole, a scarce migrant.

Order: Passeriformes Family: Oriolidae

The Old World orioles are colourful passerine birds. They are not related to the New World orioles.

- Eurasian golden oriole, Oriolus oriolus (A)

== Crows, jays, and magpies ==
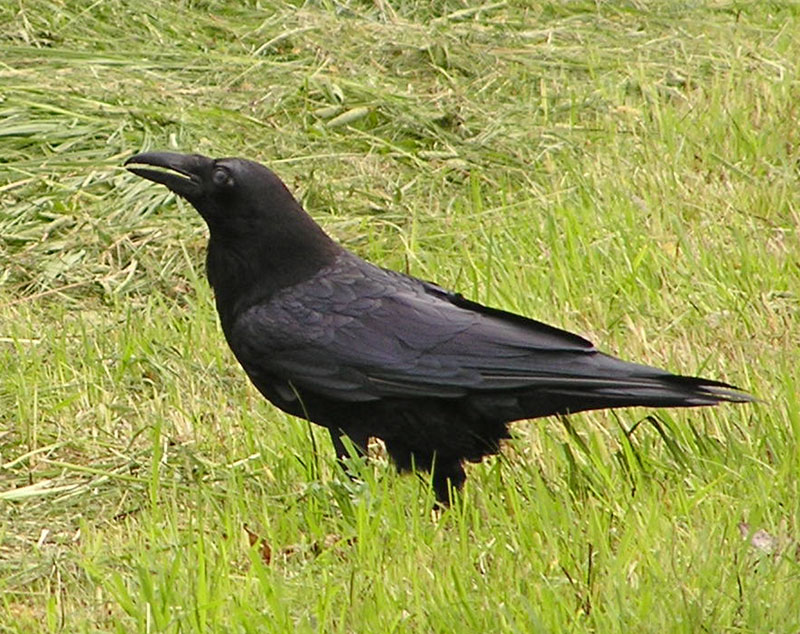
Common raven, resident in very small numbers.

Order: Passeriformes Family: Corvidae

The family Corvidae includes crows, ravens, jays, choughs, magpies, treepies, nutcrackers and ground jays. Corvids are above average in size among the Passeriformes, and some of the larger species show high levels of intelligence.

- Eurasian jay, Garrulus glandarius (B)
- Iberian magpie, Cyanopica cooki (A)
- Eurasian magpie, Pica pica (A)
- Red-billed chough, Pyrrhocorax pyrrhocorax (A)
- Alpine chough, Pyrrhocorax graculus (A)
- Western jackdaw, Corvus monedula
- Carrion crow, Corvus corone (A)
- Hooded crow, Corvus cornix (A)
- Pied crow, Corvus albus (A)
- Common raven, Corvus corax (A)

== Tits, chickadees, and titmice ==
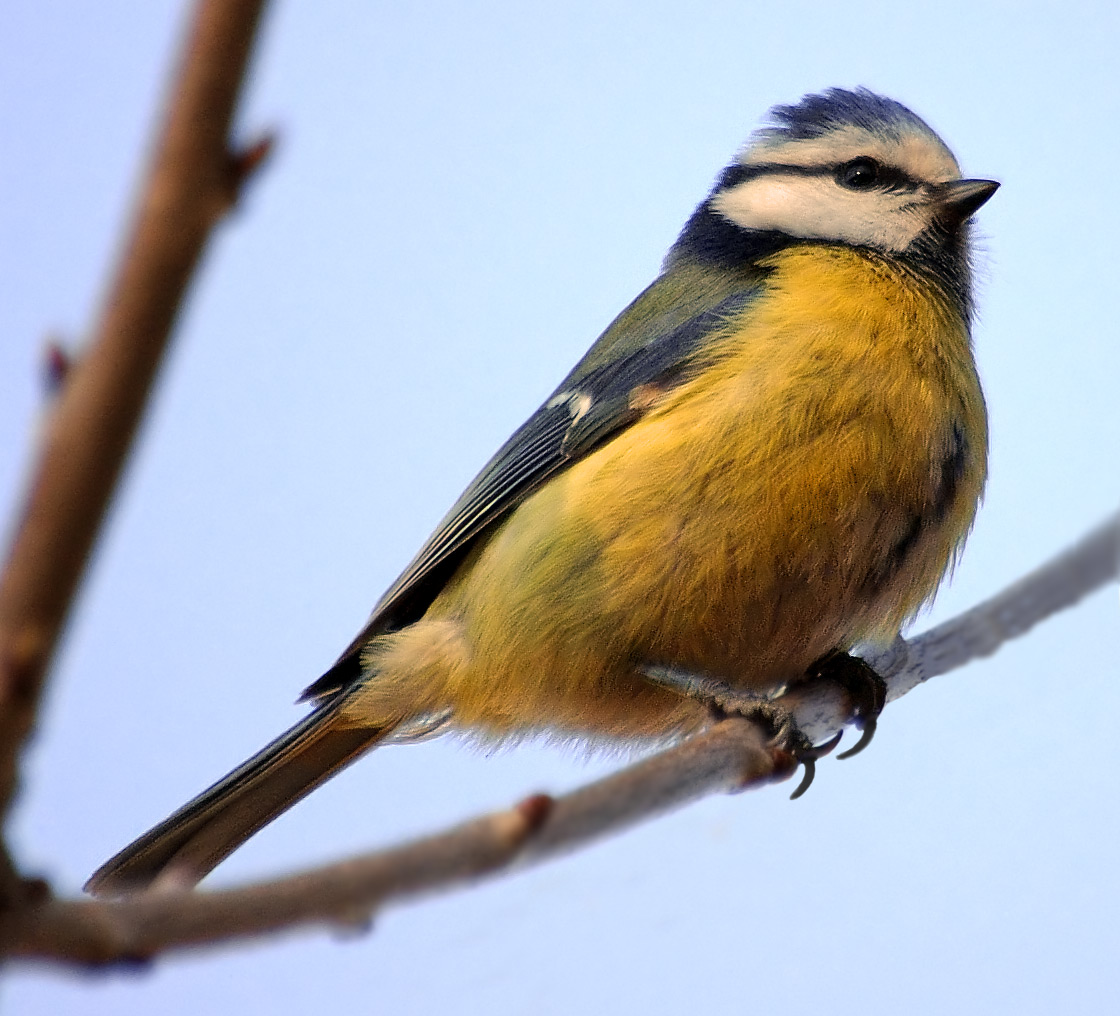
Blue tit, a common resident.

Order: Passeriformes Family: Paridae

The Paridae are mainly small stocky woodland species with short stout bills. Some have crests. They are adaptable birds, eating a mixed diet including seeds and insects.

- Coal tit, Periparus ater (A)
- Crested tit, Lophophanes cristatus (A)
- Eurasian blue tit, Cyanistes caeruleus (A)
- Great tit, Parus major (A)

== Larks ==
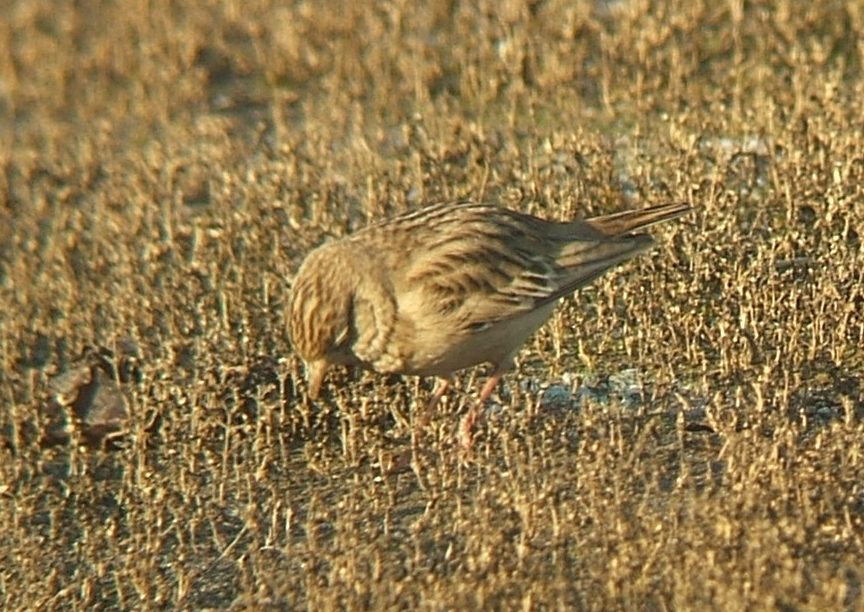
Greater short-toed lark, passes through in small numbers.

Order: Passeriformes Family: Alaudidae

Larks are small terrestrial birds with often extravagant songs and display flights. Most larks are fairly dull in appearance. Their food is insects and seeds.

- Wood lark, Lullula arborea (A)
- Eurasian skylark, Alauda arvensis (A)
- Thekla lark, Galerida theklae (A)
- Crested lark, Galerida cristata (A)
- Greater short-toed lark, Calandrella brachydactyla (A)
- Calandra lark, Melanocorypha calandra (A)
- Mediterranean short-toed lark, Alaudala rufescens (A)

== Swallows ==
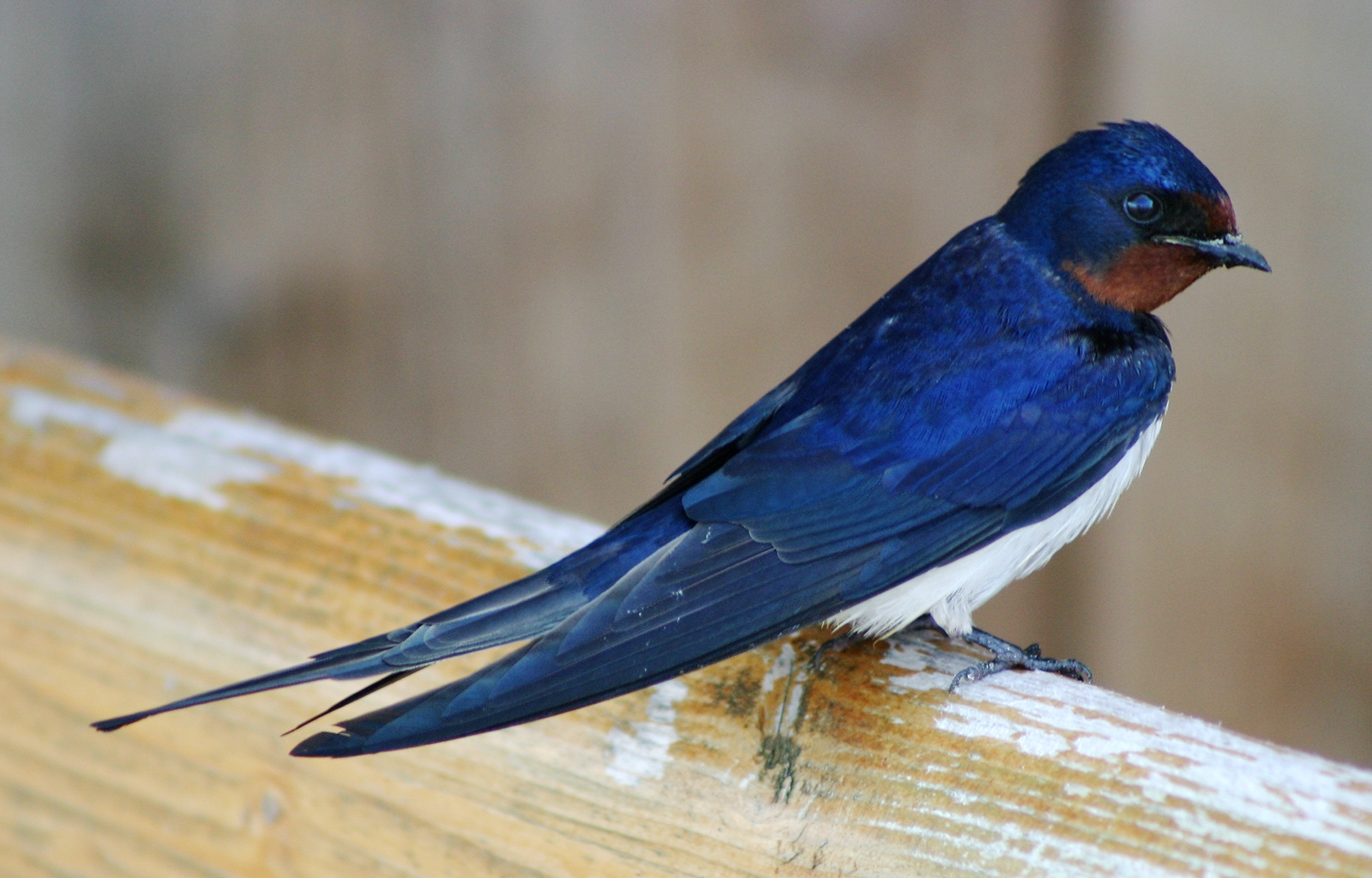
Barn swallow, a very common migrant which has bred in the past.

Order: Passeriformes Family: Hirundinidae

The family Hirundinidae is adapted to aerial feeding. They have a slender streamlined body, long pointed wings and a short bill with a wide gape. Their feet are designed for perching rather than walking, and the front toes are partially joined at the base.

- Sand martin, Riparia riparia (A)
- Eurasian crag martin, Ptyonoprogne rupestris (A)
- Barn swallow, Hirundo rustica (A)
- European red-rumped swallow, Cecropis rufula (A)
- Western house martin, Delichon urbicum (A)

== Bush warblers and allies ==
Order: Passeriformes Family: Cettiidae

The members of this family are found across western and southern Europe, Africa, southern and eastern Asia, and Polynesia.

- Cetti's warbler, Cettia cetti (A)

== Long-tailed tits ==
Order: Passeriformes Family: Aegithalidae

The long-tailed tits are a group of small passerine birds with medium to long tails. They make woven bag nests in trees. Most eat a mixed diet which includes insects.

- Long-tailed tit, Aegithalos caudatus (A)

== Leaf warblers ==
Order: Passeriformes Family: Phylloscopidae

Leaf warblers are a family of small insectivorous birds found mostly in Eurasia and ranging into Wallacea and Africa. The species are of various sizes, often green-plumaged above and yellow below, or more subdued with greyish-green to greyish-brown colours.

- Wood warbler, Phylloscopus sibilatrix (A)
- Western Bonelli's warbler, Phylloscopus bonelli (A)
- Yellow-browed warbler, Phylloscopus inornatus (A)
- Pallas's leaf warbler, Phylloscopus proregulus (A)
- Dusky warbler, Phylloscopus fuscatus (A)
- Willow warbler, Phylloscopus trochilus (A)
- Mountain chiffchaff, Phylloscopus sindianus (A)
- Common chiffchaff, Phylloscopus collybita (A)
- Iberian chiffchaff, Phylloscopus ibericus (A)
- Arctic warbler, Phylloscopus borealis (A)

== Reed warblers and allies ==
Order: Passeriformes Family: Acrocephalidae

The members of this family are usually rather large for "warblers". Most are rather plain olivaceous brown above with much yellow to beige below. They are usually found in open woodland, reedbeds, or tall grass. The family occurs mostly in southern to western Eurasia and surroundings, but it also ranges far into the Pacific, with some species in Africa.

- Great reed warbler, Acrocephalus arundinaceus (A)
- Moustached warbler, Acrocephalus melanopogon (A)
- Sedge warbler, Acrocephalus schoenobaenus (A)
- Blyth's reed warbler, Acrocephalus dumetorum (A)
- Common reed warbler, Acrocephalus scirpaceus (A)
- Booted warbler, Iduna caligata (A)
- Western olivaceous warbler, Iduna opaca (A)
- Melodious warbler, Hippolais polyglotta (A)
- Icterine warbler, Hippolais icterina (A)

== Grassbirds and allies ==
Order: Passeriformes Family: Locustellidae

Locustellidae are a family of small insectivorous songbirds found mainly in Eurasia, Africa, and the Australian region. They are smallish birds with tails that are usually long and pointed, and tend to be drab brownish or buffy all over.

- Savi's warbler, Locustella luscinioides (A)
- Common grasshopper warbler, Locustella naevia (A)

== Cisticolas and allies ==
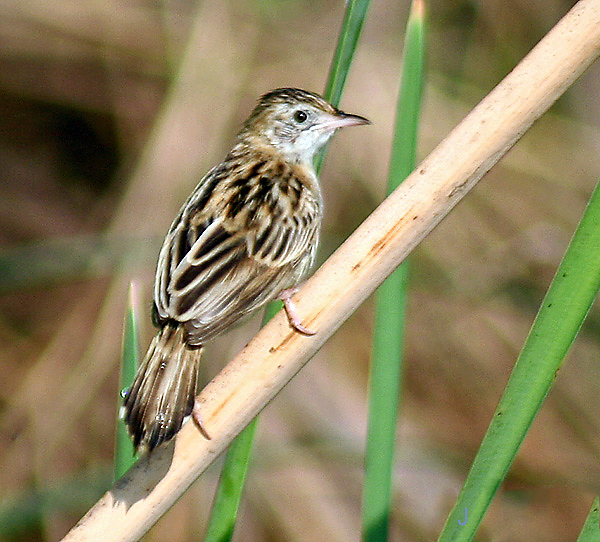
Zitting cisticola, common from autumn to spring with some staying to breed.

Order: Passeriformes Family: Cisticolidae

The Cisticolidae are warblers found mainly in warmer southern regions of the Old World. They are generally very small birds of drab brown or grey appearance found in open country such as grassland or scrub.

- Zitting cisticola, Cisticola juncidis (A)

== Sylviid warblers and allies ==
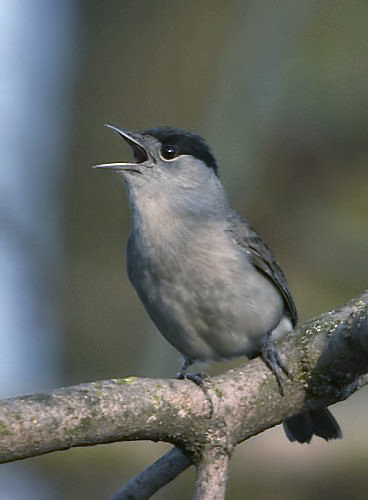
Eurasian blackcap, a resident and also a common winter visitor.

Order: Passeriformes Family: Sylviidae

The family Sylviidae is a group of small insectivorous passerine birds. They mainly occur as breeding species in Europe, Asia and, to a lesser extent, Africa. Some are of generally undistinguished appearance, but many have distinctive head patterns, and musical songs.

- Eurasian blackcap, Sylvia atricapilla (A)
- Garden warbler, Sylvia borin (A)
- Lesser whitethroat, Curruca curruca (A)
- Western Orphean warbler, Curruca hortensis (A)
- Tristram's warbler, Curruca deserticola (A)
- Sardinian warbler, Curruca melanocephala (A)
- Western subalpine warbler, Curruca iberiae (A)
- Common whitethroat, Curruca communis (A)
- Spectacled warbler, Curruca conspicillata (A)
- Marmora's warbler, Curruca sarda (A)
- Dartford warbler, Curruca undata (A)

== Crests ==
Order: Passeriformes Family: Regulidae

The crests, also called kinglets in North America, are a small group of birds formerly often included in the Old World warblers, but now given family status because they are genetically distant from them.

- Common firecrest, Regulus ignicapillus (A)
- Goldcrest, Regulus regulus (A)

== Wrens ==
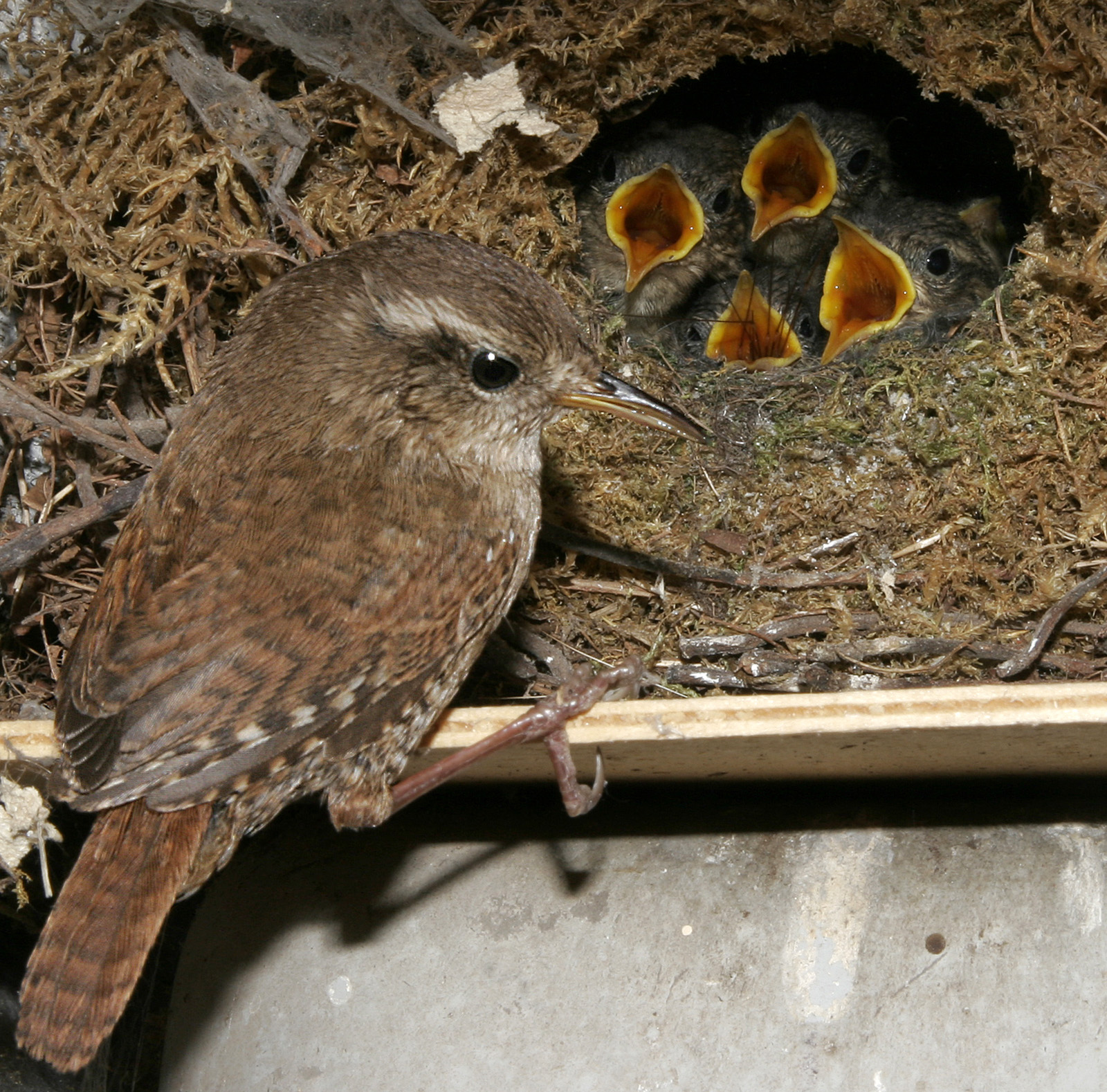
Eurasian wren, a common breeding resident.

Order: Passeriformes Family: Troglodytidae

The wrens are mainly small and inconspicuous except for their loud songs. These birds have short wings and thin down-turned bills. Several species often hold their tails upright. All are insectivorous.

- Eurasian wren, Troglodytes troglodytes (A)

== Nuthatches ==
Order: Passeriformes Family: Sittidae

Nuthatches are small woodland birds. They have the unusual ability to climb down trees head first, unlike other birds which can only go upwards. Nuthatches have big heads, short tails and powerful bills and feet.

- Eurasian nuthatch, Sitta europaea (A)

== Wallcreeper ==
Order: Passeriformes Family: Tichodromidae

The wallcreeper is a small bird related to the nuthatch family, which has stunning crimson, grey and black plumage.

- Wallcreeper, Tichodroma muraria (A)

== Treecreepers ==
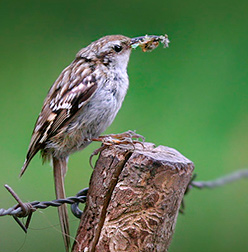
Short-toed treecreeper, an occasional visitor

Order: Passeriformes Family: Certhiidae

Treecreepers are small woodland birds, brown above and white below. They have thin pointed down-curved bills, which they use to extricate insects from bark. They have stiff tail feathers, like woodpeckers, which they use to support themselves on vertical trees.

- Short-toed treecreeper, Certhia brachydactyla (A)

== Starlings ==
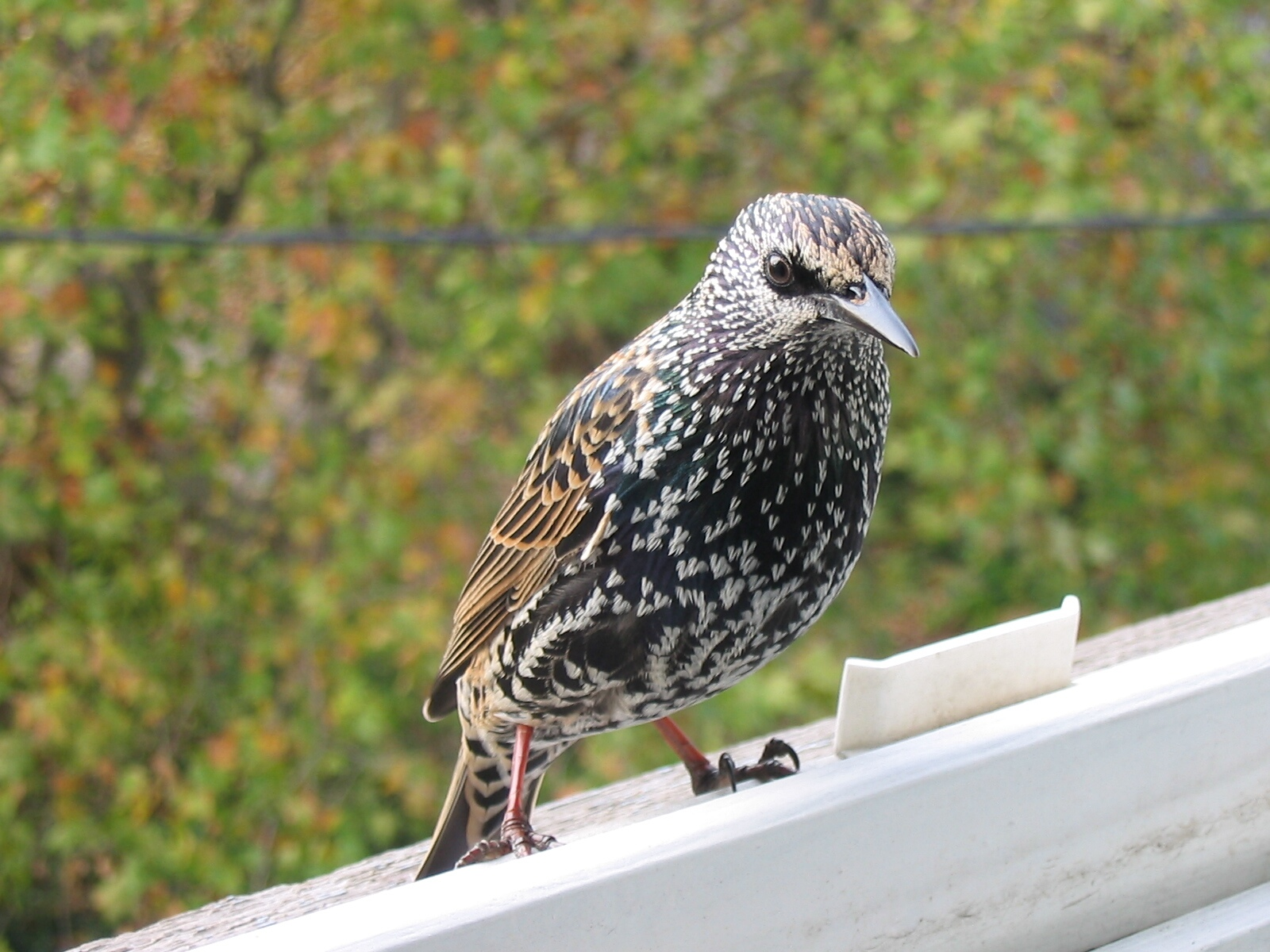
Common starling, winter visitor in varying numbers.

Order: Passeriformes Family: Sturnidae

Starlings are small to medium-sized passerine birds. Their flight is strong and direct and they are very gregarious. Their preferred habitat is fairly open country. They eat insects and fruit. Plumage is typically dark with a metallic sheen.

- Common starling, Sturnus vulgaris (A)
- Spotless starling, Sturnus unicolor (A)

== Thrushes and allies ==
Order: Passeriformes Family: Turdidae

The thrushes are a group of passerine birds that occur mainly in the Old World. They are plump, soft plumaged, small to medium-sized insectivores or sometimes omnivores, often feeding on the ground. Many have attractive songs.

- Song thrush, Turdus philomelos (A)
- Mistle thrush, Turdus viscivorus (A)
- Redwing, Turdus iliacus (A)
- Common blackbird, Turdus merula (A)
- Fieldfare, Turdus pilaris (A)
- Ring ouzel, Turdus torquatus (A)

== Old World flycatchers ==
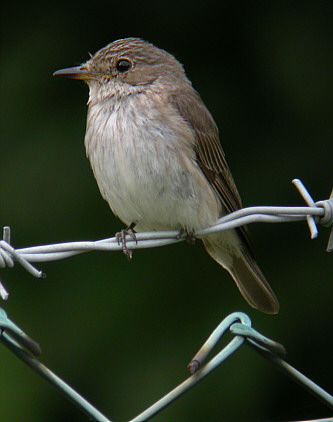
Spotted flycatcher, a common passage migrant.

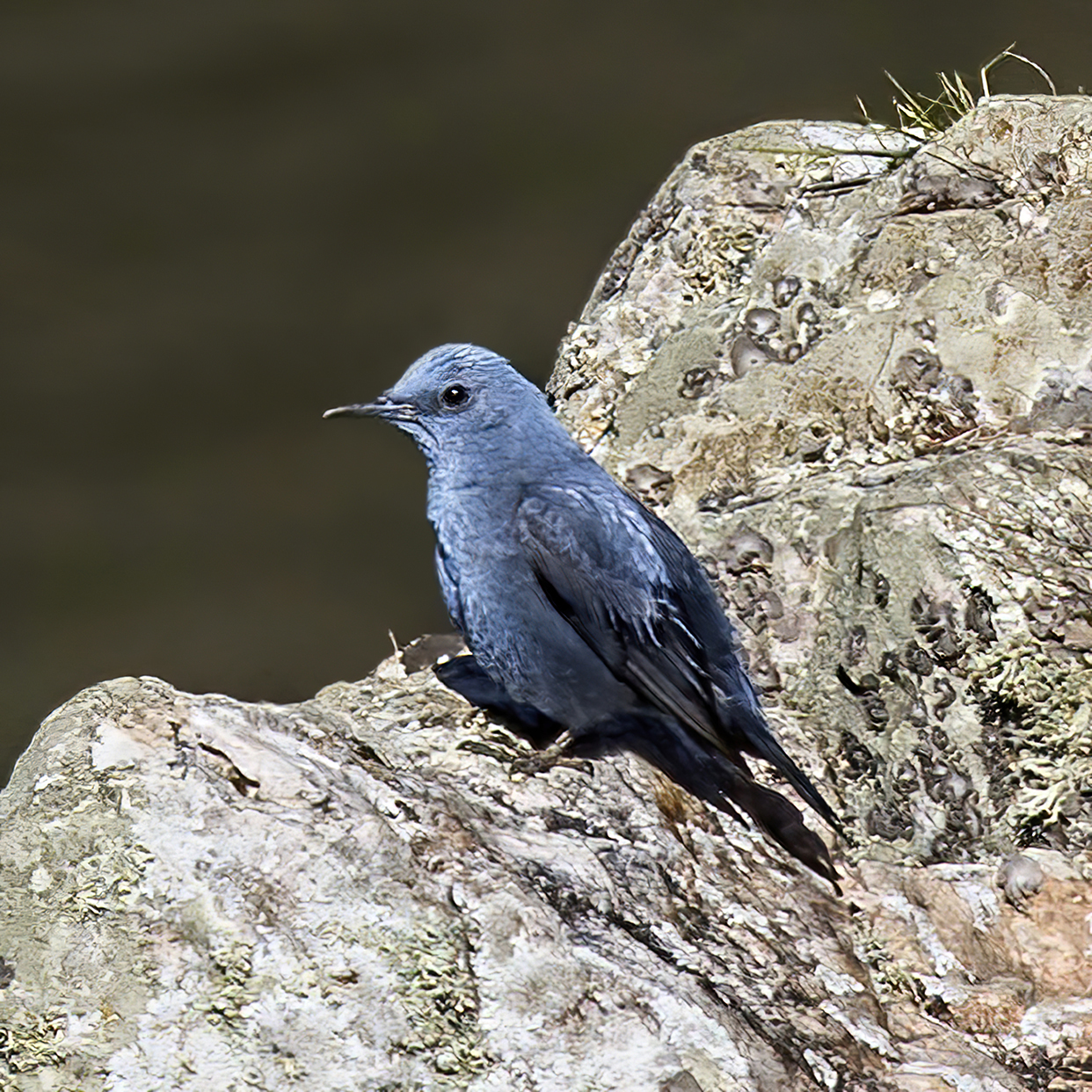
Male blue rock thrush, breeds in dry, rocky areas

Order: Passeriformes Family: Muscicapidae

Old World flycatchers and chats are a large group of small passerine birds native to the Old World. They are mainly small arboreal insectivores. The appearance of these birds is highly varied, and they mostly have weak songs and harsh calls.

- Rufous-tailed scrub-robin, Cercotrichas galactotes (A)
- Spotted flycatcher, Muscicapa striata (A)
- European robin, Erithacus rubecula (A)
- Bluethroat, Luscinia svecica (A)
- Common nightingale, Luscinia megarhynchos (A)
- Red-breasted flycatcher, Ficedula parva (A)
- European pied flycatcher, Ficedula hypoleuca (A)
- Black redstart, Phoenicurus ochruros (A)
- Common redstart, Phoenicurus phoenicurus (A)
- Common rock thrush, Monticola saxatilis (A)
- Blue rock thrush, Monticola solitarius (A)
- Whinchat, Saxicola rubetra (A)
- European stonechat, Saxicola rubicola (A)
- Northern wheatear, Oenanthe oenanthe (A)
- Atlas wheatear, Oenanthe seebohmi (A)
- Desert wheatear, Oenanthe deserti (A)
- Western black-eared wheatear, Oenanthe hispanica (A)
- Black wheatear, Oenanthe leucura (B)

== Old World sparrows ==
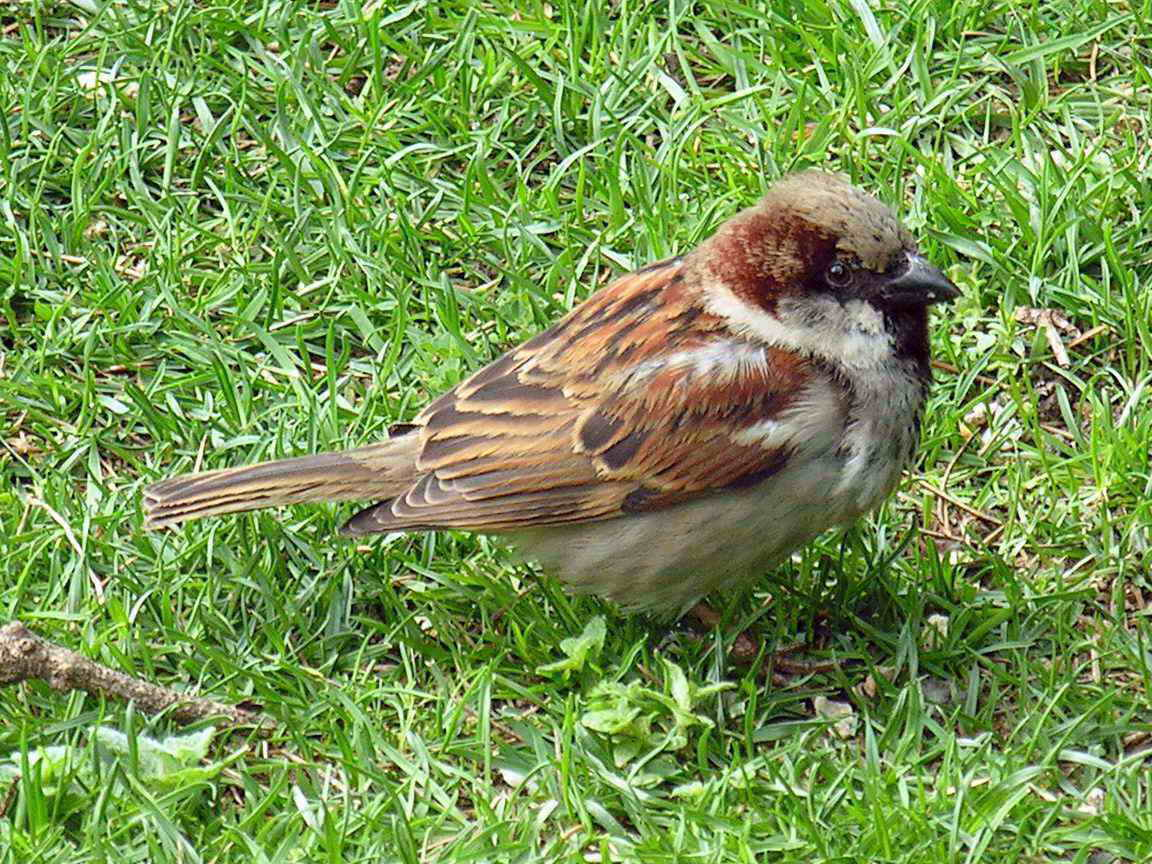
House sparrow, a common resident in built-up areas.

Order: Passeriformes Family: Passeridae

Old World sparrows are small passerine birds. In general, sparrows tend to be small, plump, brown or grey birds with short tails and short powerful beaks. Sparrows are seed-eaters, but they also consume small insects.

- Rock sparrow, Petronia petronia (A)
- Eurasian tree sparrow, Passer montanus (A)
- Spanish sparrow, Passer hispaniolensis (A)
- House sparrow, Passer domesticus (A)

== Weavers and allies ==
Order: Passeriformes Family: Ploceidae

The weavers are small passerine birds related to the sparrows, native to Africa and southern Asia. They are seed-eating birds with rounded conical bills. The males of many species are brightly coloured, usually in red or yellow and black, some species show variation in colour only in the breeding season. They are popular as cagebirds and some have established feral populations away from their native ranges.

- Black-headed weaver, Ploceus melanocephalus (C)

== Waxbills and allies ==
Order: Passeriformes Family: Estrildidae

The estrildid finches are small passerine birds of the Old World tropics and Australasia. They are gregarious and often colonial seed eaters with short thick but pointed bills. They are all similar in structure and habits, but have a wide variation in plumage colour and pattern. They are popular as cagebirds and several have established feral populations away from their native ranges.

- Common waxbill, Estrilda astrild (C)
- Black-rumped waxbill, Estrilda troglodytes (C)

== Accentors ==
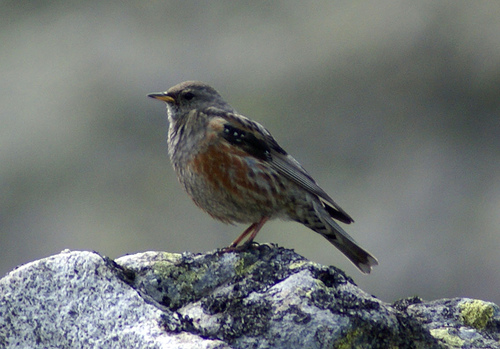
Alpine accentor, an occasional winter visitor.

Order: Passeriformes Family: Prunellidae

The accentors are in the only bird family, Prunellidae, which is completely endemic to the Palearctic. They are small, fairly drab species superficially similar to sparrows.

- Alpine accentor, Prunella collaris (A)
- Dunnock, Prunella modularis (A)

== Wagtails and pipits ==
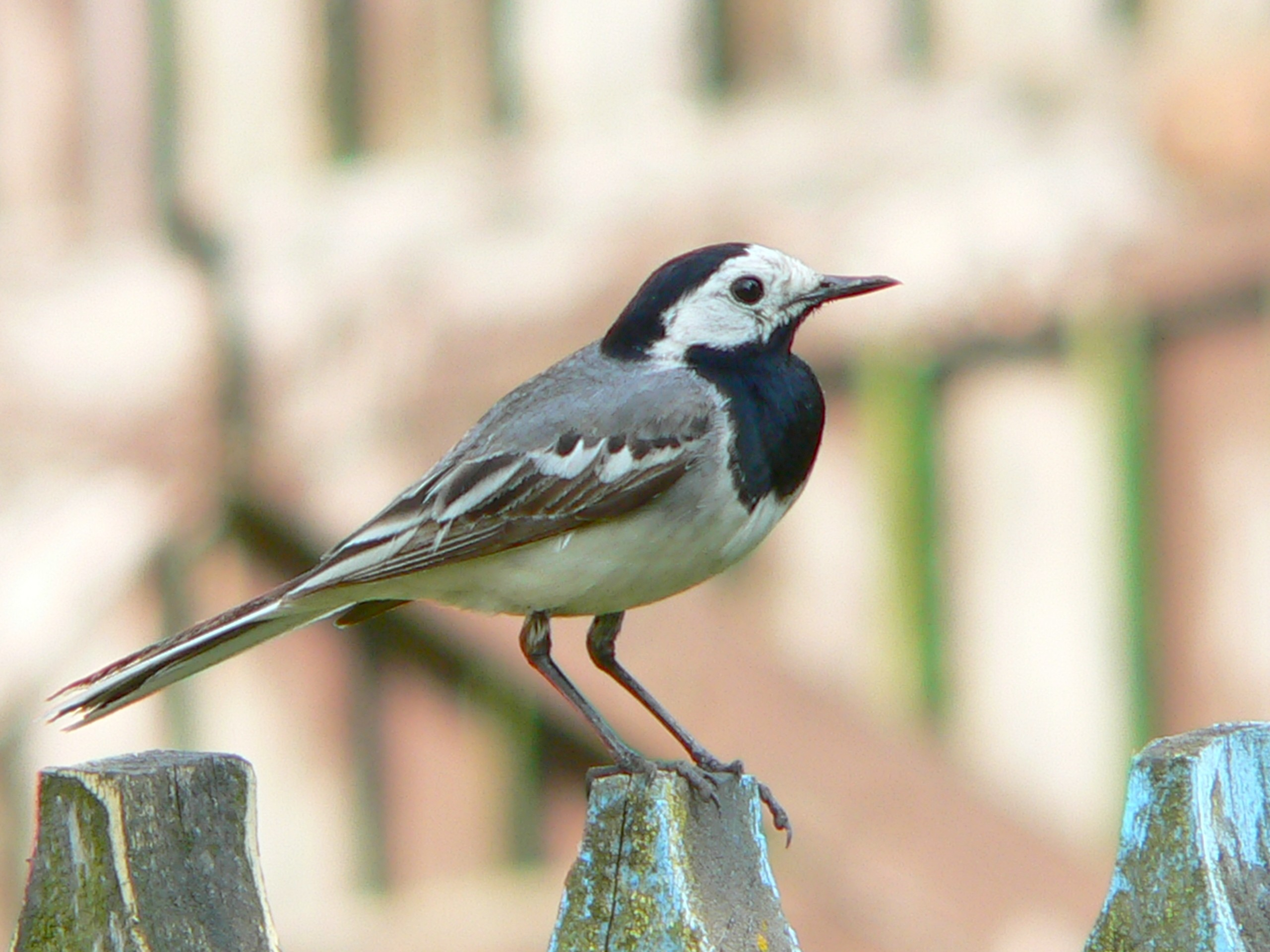
White wagtail, regular from autumn to spring and has bred.

Order: Passeriformes Family: Motacillidae

Motacillidae is a family of small passerine birds with medium to long tails. They include the wagtails, longclaws and pipits. They are slender, ground feeding insectivores of open country.

- Western yellow wagtail, Motacilla flava (A)
- Grey wagtail, Motacilla cinerea (A)
- White wagtail, Motacilla alba (A)
- Richard's pipit, Anthus richardi (A)
- Tawny pipit, Anthus campestris (A)
- Meadow pipit, Anthus pratensis (A)
- Tree pipit, Anthus trivialis (A)
- Red-throated pipit, Anthus cervinus (A)
- Water pipit, Anthus spinoletta (A)
- Rock pipit, Anthus petrosus (A)

== Finches, euphonias, and allies ==
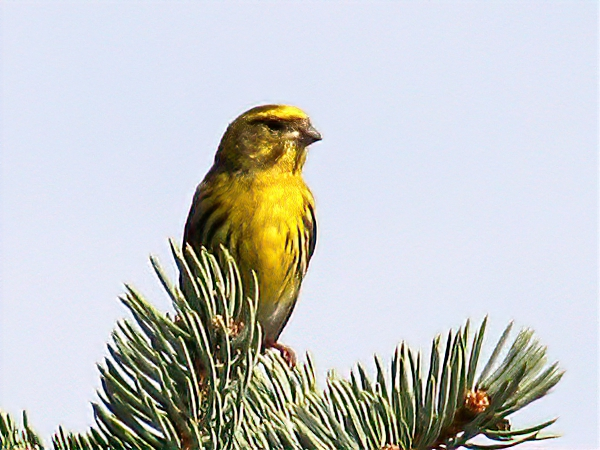
European serin, a breeding resident more common in winter.

Order: Passeriformes Family: Fringillidae

Finches are seed-eating passerine birds, that are small to moderately large and have a strong beak, usually conical and in some species very large. All have twelve tail feathers and nine primaries. These birds have a bouncing flight with alternating bouts of flapping and gliding on closed wings, and most sing well.

- Common chaffinch, Fringilla coelebs (A)
- African chaffinch, Fringilla spodiogenys (A)
- Brambling, Fringilla montifringilla (A)
- Hawfinch, Coccothraustes coccothraustes (A)
- Eurasian bullfinch, Pyrrhula pyrrhula (A)
- Trumpeter finch, Bucanetes githaginea (A)
- Common rosefinch, Carpodacus erythrinus (A)
- European greenfinch, Chloris chloris (A)
- Common linnet, Linaria cannabina (A)
- Red crossbill, Loxia curvirostra (A)
- European goldfinch, Carduelis carduelis (A)
- European serin, Serinus serinus (A)
- Eurasian siskin, Spinus spinus (A)

== Longspurs and snow buntings ==
Order: Passeriformes Family: Calcariidae

The Calcariidae are a family of birds that had been traditionally grouped with the buntings, but differ in a number of respects and are usually found in open grassy areas.

- Snow bunting, Plectrophenax nivalis (A)

== Old World buntings ==
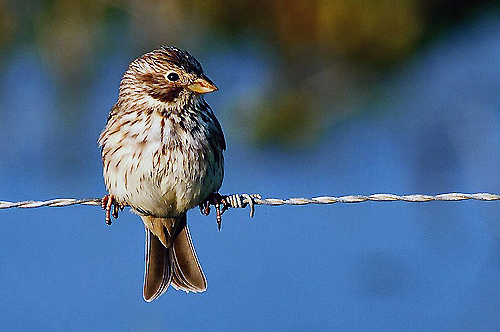
Corn bunting, an occasional visitor.

Order: Passeriformes Family: Emberizidae

The buntings are a large family of passerine birds. They are seed eaters with distinctively shaped bills. Many species have distinctive head patterns.

- Corn bunting, Emberiza calandra (A)
- Yellowhammer, Emberiza citrinella (A)
- Pine bunting, Emberiza leucocephalos (A)
- Rock bunting, Emberiza cia (A)
- Ortolan bunting, Emberiza hortulana (A)
- Cirl bunting, Emberiza cirlus (A)
- House bunting, Emberiza sahari (A)
- Little bunting, Emberiza pusilla (A)
- Reed bunting, Emberiza schoeniclus (A)

== New World sparrows ==
Order: Passeriformes Family: Passerellidae

The New World sparrows (or American sparrows) are a large family of seed-eating passerine birds with distinctively finch-like bills. Several species have been recorded as transatlantic vagrants in Europe.

- Dark-eyed junco, Junco hyemalis (A)
- White-throated sparrow, Zonotrichia albicollis (A)

== Troupials and allies ==
Order: Passeriformes Family: Icteridae

The icterids are a group of small to medium-sized, often colourful, passerine birds restricted to the New World and include the grackles, New World blackbirds and New World orioles. Most species have black as the predominant plumage colour, often enlivened by yellow, orange or red. A few species have been recorded as transatlantic vagrants in Europe.

- Bobolink, Dolichonyx oryzivorus (A)

== New World warblers ==
Order: Passeriformes Family: Parulidae

The New World warblers are a group of small often colourful passerine birds restricted to the New World. Most are arboreal, but some are more terrestrial; most are insectivores. Several species have been recorded as transatlantic vagrants in Europe.

- Yellow-rumped warbler, Setophaga coronata (A)

== Cardinals and allies ==
Order: Passeriformes Family: Cardinalidae

The cardinals are a family of robust, seed-eating birds with strong bills. They are typically associated with open woodland. The sexes usually have distinct plumage. A few species have been recorded as transatlantic vagrants in Europe.

- Indigo bunting, Passerina cyanea (A)

== See also ==
- List of birds
- Lists of birds by region
- List of mammals of Gibraltar
- List of reptiles and amphibians of Gibraltar
