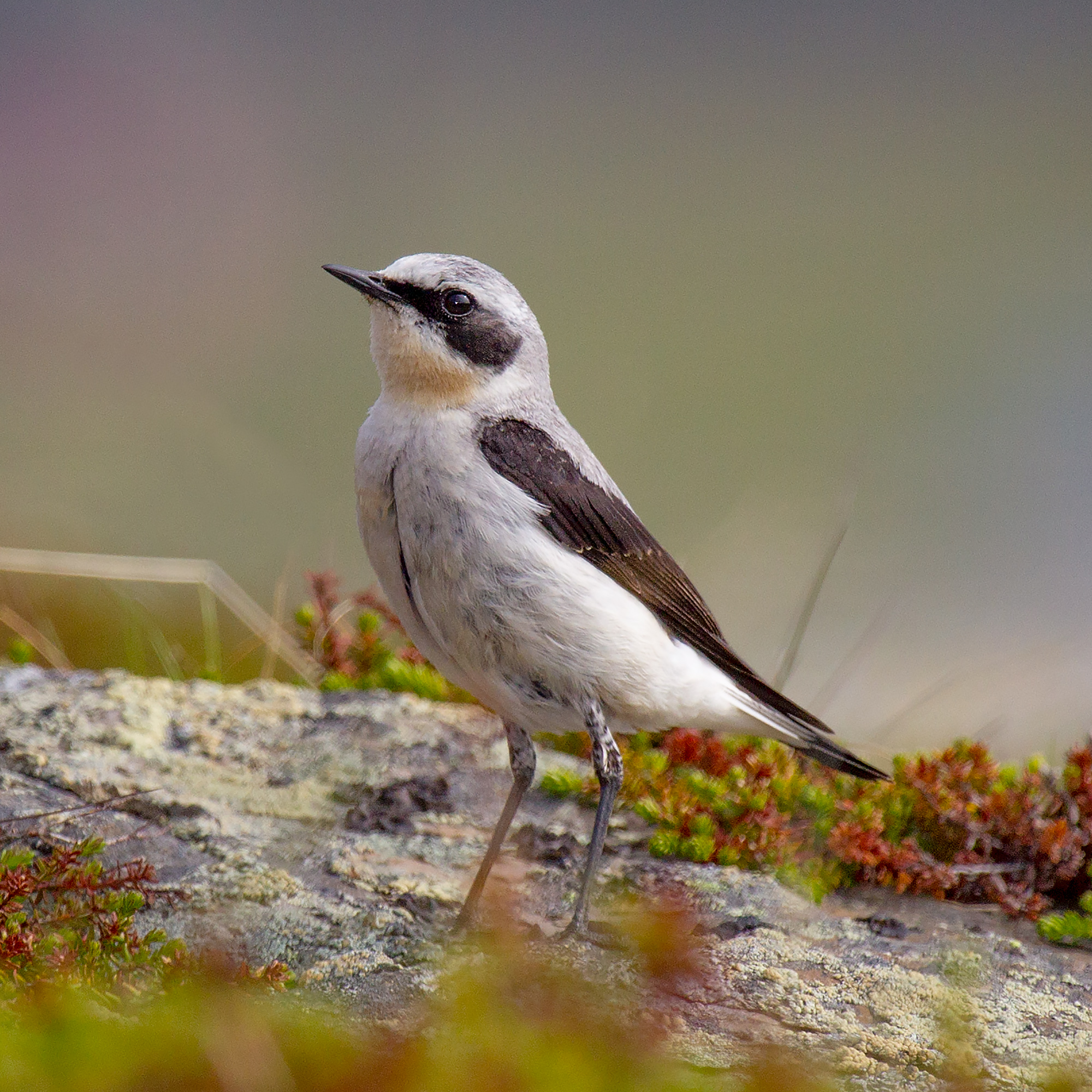
- Male in breeding-plumage
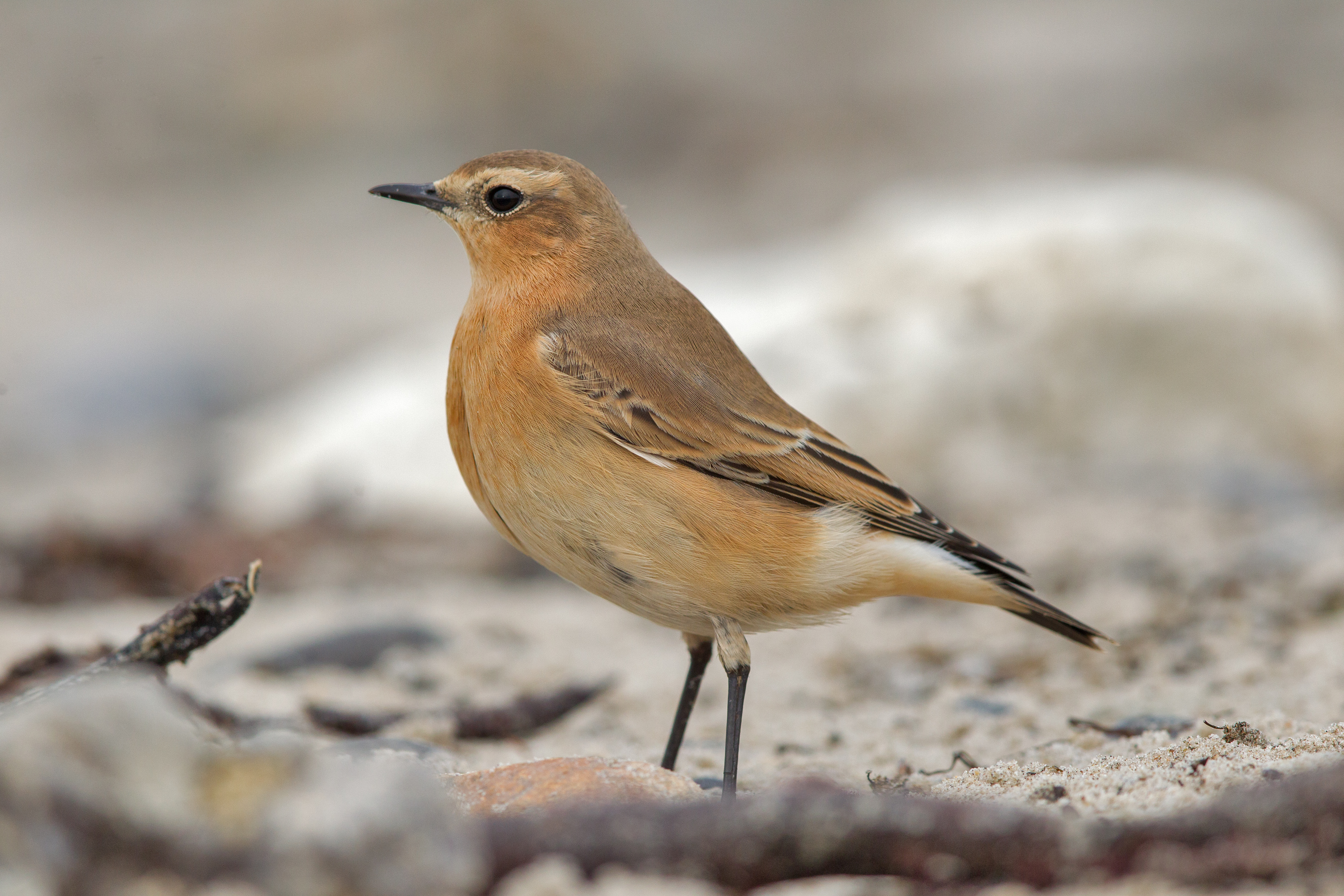
- Female Song of male, Devon, England

Conservation status
- Least Concern (IUCN 3.1)

Scientific classification
- Kingdom: Animalia
- Phylum: Chordata
- Class: Aves
- Order: Passeriformes
- Family: Muscicapidae
- Genus: Oenanthe
- Species: O. oenanthe

Binomial name
- Oenanthe oenanthe (Linnaeus, 1758)

Synonyms
- Motacilla oenanthe Linnaeus, 1758

= Northern wheatear =

Species of bird

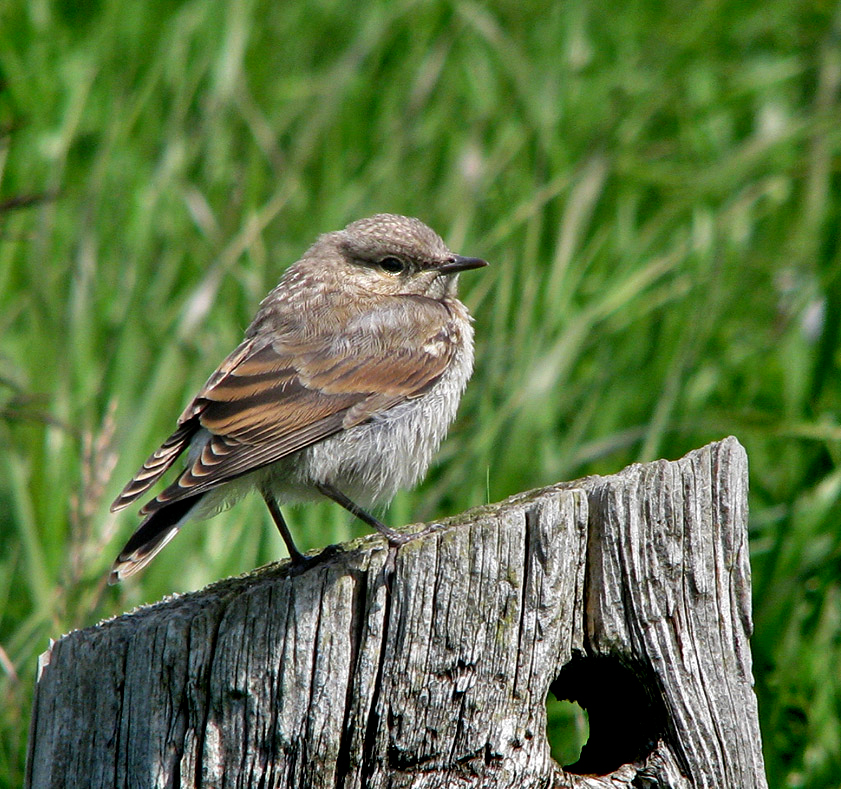
Northern wheatear juvenile

The northern wheatear or wheatear (Oenanthe oenanthe) is a small passerine bird in the Old World flycatcher family. It is the most widespread member of the wheatear genus Oenanthe in Europe and North and Central Asia. The northern wheatear is a migratory insectivorous species breeding in open stony country in Europe and east across the Palearctic with footholds in northeastern Canada and Greenland as well as in northwestern Canada and Alaska. It nests in rock crevices and rabbit burrows. All birds spend most of their winter in Africa.

== Taxonomy and systematics ==
The northern wheatear belongs to a distinctive group of Old World flycatchers, known as chats, that were formerly thought to be thrushes. Genetic analysis showed that they were in fact a type of flycatcher (Muscicapidae), with the resemblance to thrushes being the result of convergent evolution. The northern wheatear was first formally described by the Swedish naturalist Carl Linnaeus in 1758 in the 10th edition of his Systema Naturae as Motacilla oenanthe. The species is now placed in the genus Oenanthe that was introduced by the French ornithologist Louis Pierre Vieillot in 1816. The generic name, Oenanthe, is also the name of a plant genus, the water dropworts, and is derived from the Greek ainos "wine" and anthos "flower", from the wine-like scent of the flowers. In the case of the wheatear, it refers to the birds' return to Greece in the spring at the time that the grapevines blossom.

Its English name has nothing to do with wheat or with ear, but is an altered (perhaps bowdlerised) form of white-arse, which refers to its prominent white rump.

The four generally accepted subspecies of the Northern Wheatear with their breeding range are as follows:

- O. o. leucorhoa (Gmelin, JF, 1789) – northeast Canada, Greenland and Iceland (the 'Greenland wheatear')
- O. o. oenanthe (Linnaeus, 1758) – north and central Europe through north Asia to east Siberia and northwest North America
- O. o. libanotica (Hemprich & Ehrenberg, 1833) – southern Europe through the Middle East and southwest Asia to Mongolia and northwest China
- O. o. seebohmi (Dixon, 1882) – northwest Africa

O.o. seebohmi is regarded as a distinct species by some authorities such as the International Ornithological Committee, Seebohm's or the Atlas wheatear.

== Description ==
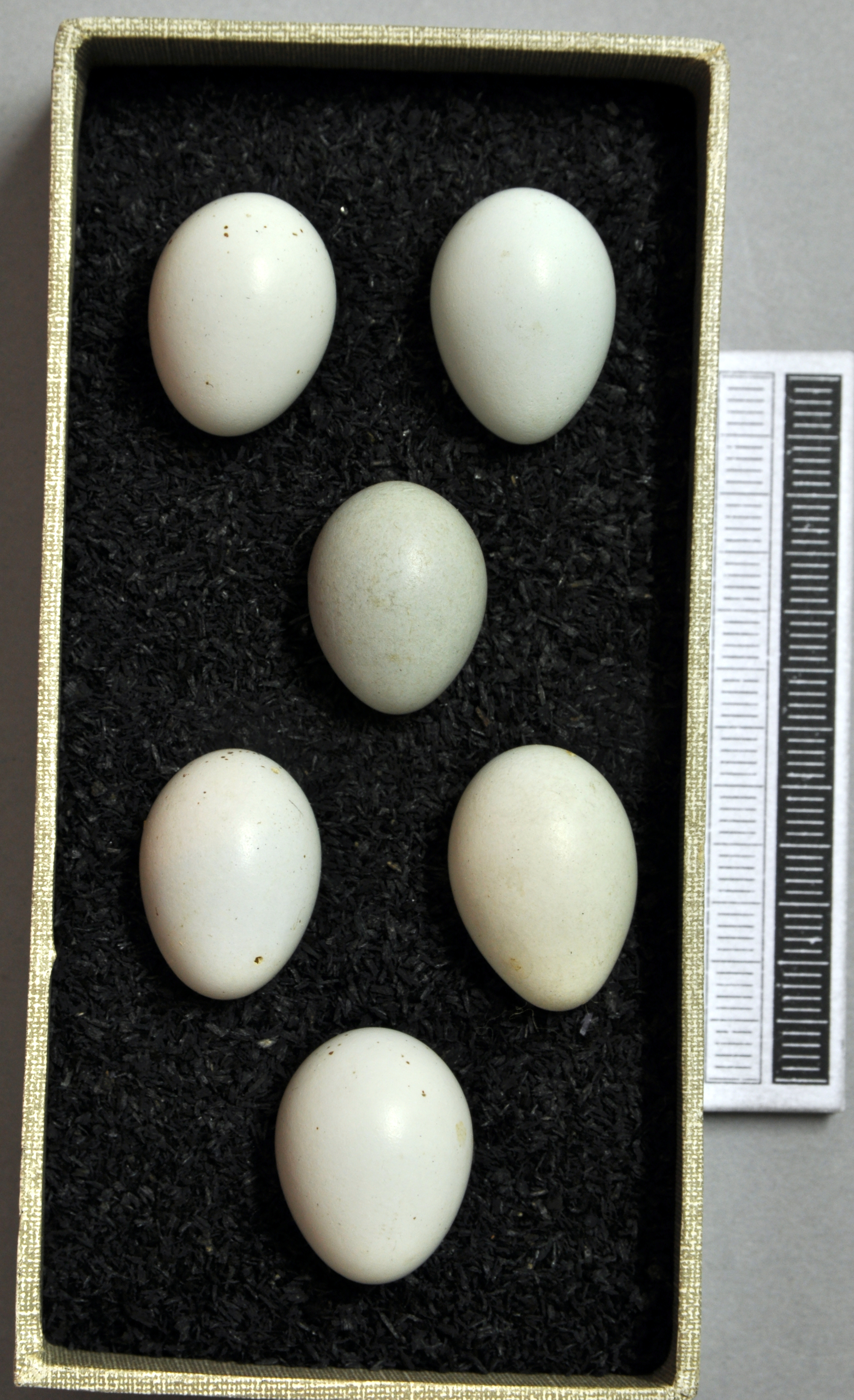
Eggs, Collection Museum Wiesbaden

The northern wheatear is larger than the European robin at 14.5–16 cm (5.7–6.3 in) in length. The northern wheatear also has a wingspan of 26–32 cm and weighs 17–30 g.

Both sexes have a white rump and tail, with a black inverted T-pattern at the end of the tail.

The plumage of the summer male has grey upperparts, buff throat and black wings and face mask. In autumn it resembles the female apart from the black wings. The female is pale brown above and buff below with darker brown wings. The male has a whistling, crackly song. Its call is a typical chat chack noise, and the flight call is the same.

== Behaviour and ecology ==
=== Migration ===
The northern wheatear makes one of the longest journeys of any small bird, crossing ocean, ice, and desert. It migrates from Sub-Saharan Africa in the spring over a vast area of the Northern Hemisphere that includes northern and central Asia, Europe, Greenland, Alaska, and parts of Canada. In autumn all return to Africa, where their ancestors had wintered. Arguably, some of the birds that breed in north Asia could take a shorter route and winter in south Asia; however, their inherited inclination to migrate takes them back to Africa, completing one of the longest migrations for its body size in the animal kingdom.

Birds of the large, bright Greenland race, leucorhoa, make one of the longest transoceanic crossings of any passerine. In spring most migrate along a route (commonly used by waders and waterfowl) from Africa via continental Europe, the British Isles, and Iceland to Greenland. However, autumn sightings from ships suggest that some birds cross the North Atlantic directly from Canada and Greenland to southwest Europe, a distance of up to 2,500 kilometres (1,600 mi). Birds breeding in eastern Canada are thought to fly from Baffin Island and Newfoundland via Greenland, Ireland, and Portugal to the Azores, crossing 3,500 kilometres (2,200 mi) of the North Atlantic) before flying onwards to Africa. Other populations from western Canada and Alaska migrate by flying over much of Eurasia to Africa.

Miniature tracking devices have recently shown that the northern wheatear has one of the longest migratory flights known - 30,000 km (18,640 miles), from sub-Saharan Africa to their Arctic breeding grounds.

"The Alaskan birds travelled almost 15,000km (9,000 miles) each way - crossing Siberia and the Arabian Desert, and travelling, on average, 290km per day. "This is the longest recorded migration for a songbird as far as we know," said Dr Schmaljohann.

=== Breeding ===
Northern wheatears first breed when they are one year old. The nest is built entirely by the female while the male perches nearby, sings and sometimes performs song-flights. The nest is placed in a cavity such as a rabbit burrow, a crevice among rocks or in a man-made object such as a wall or pipe. The nest typically has a foundation of untidy plant material. The nest cup is constructed of finer grasses, leaves, moss and lichen. The female lays eggs at daily intervals. The clutch is 4–7 smooth but not glossy eggs that are around 21.0 mm × 15.8 mm (0.83 in × 0.62 in) in size with an average weight of 2.83 g (0.100 oz). The eggs are very pale blue in colour and sometimes have a few red-brown marks at the larger end. They are incubated almost entirely by the female beginning after the penultimate or final egg has been laid. The eggs hatch after approximately 13 days. The chicks are fed by both parents and are brooded by the female for the first five or six days. They fledge after 15 days and become independent of their parents when they are between 28 and 32 days old. Normally only a single brood is raised each year but when a clutch of eggs is lost, the female will lay a second clutch.

== Status and conservation ==
The northern wheatear has an extensive range, estimated at 2.3 million square kilometres (0.87 million square miles), and a large population estimated at 2.9 million individuals in the Old World and the Americas combined. The species is not believed to approach the thresholds for the population decline criterion of the IUCN Red List (i.e., declining more than 30% in ten years or three generations), and is therefore evaluated as least concern.

== Relationship with humans ==
In the 18th and 19th centuries wheatears were considered a delicacy in England, called "the English ortolan" and Sussex shepherds supplemented their income by selling the birds they trapped.

== Sources ==
- Cramp, Stanley, ed. (1988). "Oenanthe oenanthe Wheatear". Handbook of the birds of Europe the Middle East and North Africa. The Birds of the Western Palearctic. Volume V: Tyrant Flycatchers to Thrushes. Oxford: Oxford University Press. pp. 770–792. ISBN 978-0-19-857508-5.
