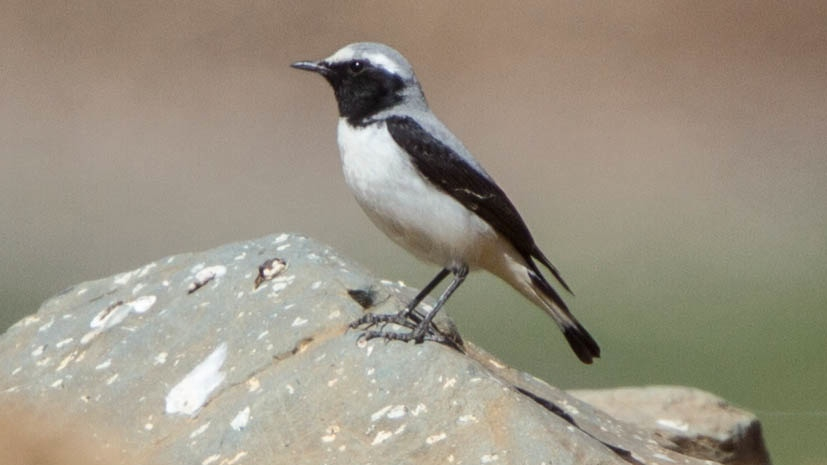

Conservation status
- Least Concern (IUCN 3.1)

Scientific classification
- Kingdom: Animalia
- Phylum: Chordata
- Class: Aves
- Order: Passeriformes
- Family: Muscicapidae
- Genus: Oenanthe
- Species: O. seebohmi

Binomial name
- Oenanthe seebohmi (Dixon, 1882)

= Atlas wheatear =

Species of bird

The Atlas wheatear (Oenanthe seebohmi), also known as the black-throated wheatear or Seebohm's wheatear, is a small passerine bird which breeds in the Maghreb region of North Africa and winters in the western Sahel. It was formerly considered a subspecies of the northern wheatear (O. oenanthe) as O. o. seebohmi, but was reclassified as a distinct species by the IOC in 2021.

== Taxonomy ==
Seebohm's wheatear was formerly regarded as the North African subspecies of the widespread Northern wheatear of Eurasia, Greenland and northern North America, however, it is now regarded as a full species. Atlas wheatear has been proposed as the English common name for this species by the International Ornithological Committee.

== Description ==
Adult male Atlas wheatears in breeding are very distinctive when compared to northern wheatear, having a black throat, face, lores and ear coverts, sometimes extending to the uppermost part of the breast, occasionally with some buff mixed in. Upperparts are similar to adult male Northern wheatear but sometimes has more white on the forehead and less extensive area of black on the tip of the tail where the white colour may extend along the outer tail. The axillaries and underwing coverts are black and the underparts are often whiter than in northern wheatear. After the post-breeding moult the upperparts are pale brown with the wing coverts, primaries, secondaries and tertials finely tipped with buff while the greater coverts show whitish tips. The fresh black throat is spotted with paler tips to the feathers and the breast has a buffish tinge. The females are variable from closely resembling the females of the nominate subspecies or showing brown ear coverts and having black or blackish-brown colour over the chin and lores tipped with buff, grey or sandy colour. The upperparts are greyer, often similar to the adult male, although may show a more buffy shade.

== Voice ==
The Atlas wheatear's song is slightly slower and lower pitched than that of the northern wheatear, with its melodious rising and falling phrases being more distinct than in Northern. Calls are otherwise similar to the northern wheatear.

== Distribution and population ==
The Atlas wheatear has a disjunct breeding range in northwestern Africa: in north-eastern Morocco where it breeds in the Rif, the Middle Atlas, the High Atlas and central Anti Atlas mountains with another population in north-eastern Algeria in the Aurès Mountains and in the Djurdjura Range. It winters in the western Sahel, mainly in south-western Mauritania, northern Senegal and western Mali with smaller numbers in central Mali and some seen at times in winter in southern Morocco. The bulk of the population winters between 15–18°N and 09–16°W. It is estimated that 50,000 Seebohm's wheatears winter in west Africa where they overlap with Northern wheatears.

== Habitat ==
The Atlas wheatear breeds in mountains on stony plateaux and sparsely vegetated slopes with scattered boulders between 1,700 and 2,300m, although may breed as low as 150m in Algeria. It nests in holes in the ground or between boulders. It winters in open areas of semi-arid savanna although it favours the more humid Guinea savanna with scattered trees such as acacia, Balanites and Salvadora over more arid regions nearer the edge of the desert.
