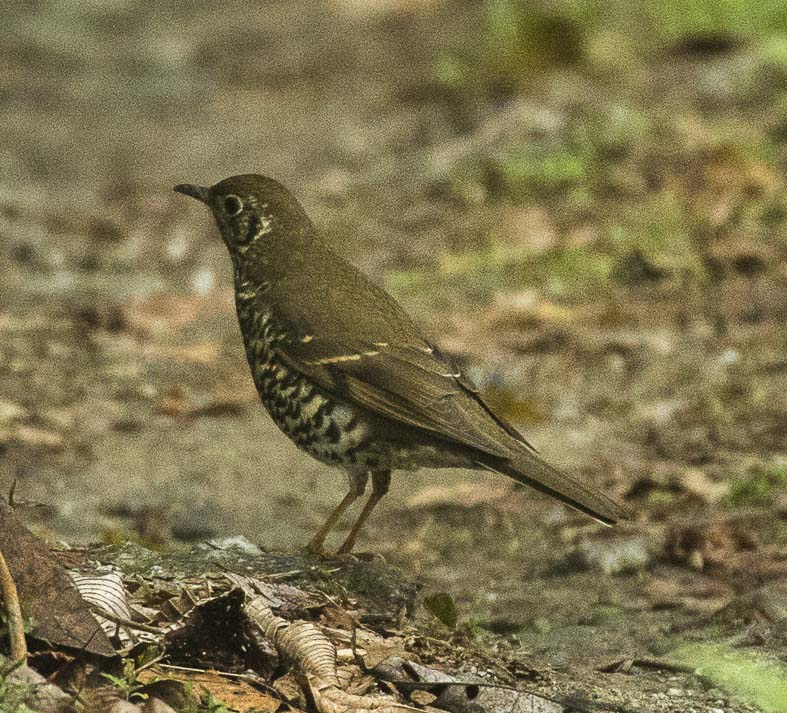

Conservation status
- Least Concern (IUCN 3.1)

Scientific classification
- Kingdom: Animalia
- Phylum: Chordata
- Class: Aves
- Order: Passeriformes
- Family: Turdidae
- Genus: Zoothera
- Species: Z. dixoni

Binomial name
- Zoothera dixoni (Seebohm, 1881)

= Long-tailed thrush =

Species of bird

The long-tailed thrush (Zoothera dixoni) is a species of bird in the family Turdidae. It is found from the central and eastern Himalayas to south-central and south-western China. Its natural habitats are subtropical or tropical moist montane forests and subtropical or tropical high-altitude shrubland.

The scientific name, Zoothera dixoni, is named after ornithologist Charles Dixon.
