= Charles Dixon (ornithologist) =

English ornithologist

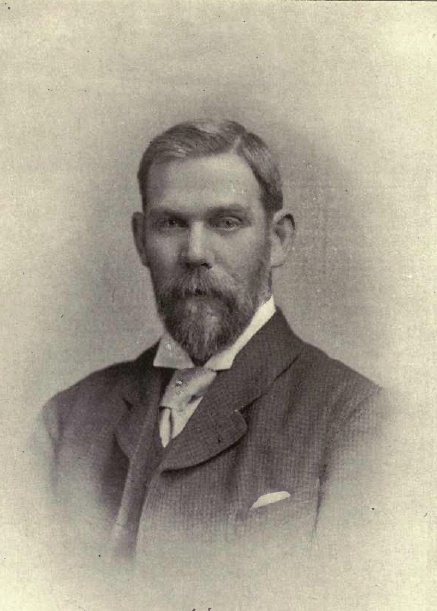
Charles Dixon

Charles Dixon (1858 – 17 June 1926) was an English ornithologist, born in London. He discovered the St Kilda wren and a new species in North Africa. He collaborated with Henry Seebohm on his great work on British Birds, in the second volume of which he summarized and modified A. R. Wallace's theory of the relation between nests and coloration of birds. Elliott Coues wrote in the preface to the American edition of Dixon's book "Rural bird life" pointing out the originality of the observations made from the field and Julian Huxley noted Dixon for recognizing the value of prismatic binoculars for bird study. In his later years, he wrote in the newspapers on agricultural fairs and horse shows.

== Biography ==
Little is known of Dixon's early life. Dixon's early studies on ornithology were followed by numerous books. He did not believe in the role of natural selection in evolution and in his Evolution without Natural Selection (1885) he used examples of adaptations that were apparently of little survival value to illustrate his position. Reviewers were quick to point out that natural selection essentially works on adaptations that do have a survival value. He also argued that Darwin was mistaken to conclude that ornate male plumages evolved due to female selection.

Dixon made a special study of bird migration — especially in his 1892 book The Migration of Birds (new edition, 1897), an ingenious theoretical work — and of geographical distribution of birds. Dixon changed his ideas drastically between the two editions of his book on migration. In the 1892 edition he supported the idea that birds moved out of unfavourable environmental conditions but in the 1897 edition he suggested that migration is essentially derived from dispersal and range extension of birds. He believed that glaciation in former times could not have induced migration on its own and that southward migration was because of a former mass of tropical land that stretched around the equator. Reviewers did not think of his theories as being well-founded. Julian Huxley recognized him for noting the potential of prismatic binoculars to unravel the life of living birds. He also published behavioural observations on birds and often incorporated these in his books. He recognized the threats to birds posed by human activity and was an early conservationist. He was quite opposed to the ideas of acclimatisation and recognized the problem of introduction of species into Australia and New Zealand and their effects, especially on flightless birds. He expressed his conservation ethic thus:

After all, we only hold the fauna of the world in trust, and it is but our bare duty to posterity to hand that fauna down as intact as we found it, or as nearly so as the reasonable exigencies of life will admit.

== Publications ==
Of his many books, the following may be mentioned:

- Rural Bird Life (1880)
- Evolution without Natural Selection (1885)
- Our Rarer Birds (1888).
- Stray feathers from many birds: being leaves from a naturalist's note-book (1890).
- Annals of bird life : a year-book of British ornithology (1890).
- The Birds of our Rambles (1891).
- The Migration of Birds (1892).
- Jottings about Birds (1893).
- The Nests and Eggs of British Birds (1893; illustrated, 1894)
- British Sea Birds (1896).
- Our favourite song birds (1897)
- Curiosities of bird life (1897)
- Lost and Vanishing Birds (1898).
- Game Birds and Wild Fowl of the British Islands (1899).
- Bird-life in a Southern County (1899).
- The Story of the Birds (1900).
- Among the birds in Northern Shires (1900)
- Birds' Nests (1902).
- Open Air Studies in Bird Life: Sketches of British Birds in Their Haunts (1903).
- The Bird Life of London (1909)

In later life he took an interest in agricultural and horse shows, especially the Richmond horse show. He died of a heart attack at his home in Harlesden in 1926. Seebohm named the long-tailed thrush Zoothera dixoni (originally in the genus Geocichla).
