= Wood owl =

Wood owl refers to several species of owls of genus Strix, with a round face and no ear-tufts

- Spotted wood owl, Strix seloputo
- Mottled wood owl, Strix ocellata
- Brown wood owl, Strix leptogrammica
  - Bartels's wood owl or Javan wood owl, Strix (leptogrammica) bartelsi
  - Himalayan wood owl, Strix (leptogrammica) newarensis
- Barred owl, Strix varia (also called wood owl)
- African wood owl, Strix woodfordii (formerly Ciccaba woodfordii)
