= Taxonomy of the tawny owl =

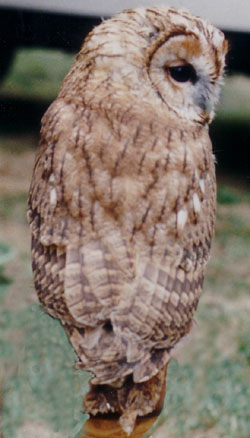
An individual probably of the western subspecies S. a. sylvatica

The tawny owl was first described by Swedish naturalist Carl Linnaeus in the tenth edition of his Systema Naturae in 1758, under its current scientific name Strix aluco. The binomial derives from the Greek strix "owl" and Italian allocco "tawny owl" (which in turn comes from the Latin ulucus "screech-owl"). Some early descriptions upon review were found to have somehow conflated the very different barn owl by describing it with the same scientific name Strix aluco, which in turn engendered some confusion.

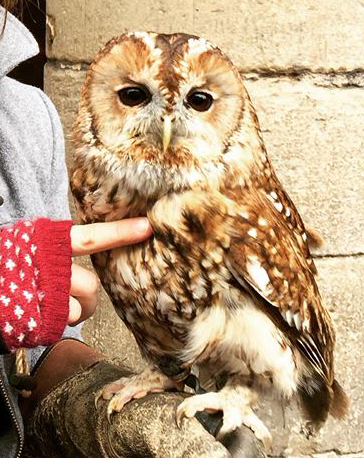
An individual from France perched upon a human hand

The tawny owl is a member of the wood-owl genus Strix, part of the true owl family Strigidae, which contains all species of owl other than the barn owls. Conservatively, about 18 species are currently represented in this Strix genus, typically being medium to large sized owls that are characteristically round-headed and lacking ear tufts, which acclimate to living in forested parts of various climatic zones. Four owls native to the neotropics are sometimes additionally included with the Strix genus, though some authors include these in a separate but related genus, Ciccaba. Strix owls have an extensive fossil record and have long been widely distributed. The genetic relationship of true owls is somewhat muddled and different genetic testings has variously indicated that Strix owls are related to disparate appearing genera like Pulsatrix, Bubo and Asio. Tropical species, such as the mottled owl (Strix virgata) and the African wood owl (Strix woodfordii), the latter once considered a close relative to the tawny owl, morphologically differ from and have smaller outer ear areas than tawny owls.

The tawny owl is thought to be a close relative of the Ural owl. Authors have hypothesized that the origin of the divide between these two species followed the Pleistocene continental glaciations, which segregated a southwest or southern group in temperate forest (i.e. the tawny) from an eastern one inhabiting cold, boreal ranges (i.e. the Ural). After retreat of the continental ice masses, the ranges more recently penetrated each other. While the life history details of the tawny and Ural owls are largely corresponding, the species nonetheless have a number of morphological differences and are largely adapted to different climates, times of activity and habitats. Strix fossil species from the Middle Pleistocene (given the name Strix intermedia) in the Czech Republic, Austria and Hungary indicate from leg and wing bones an owl of intermediate form and size between Ural and tawny owls. However, fossils of a larger and differently proportioned Strix owl than a tawny owl, identified as Strix brevis, from Germany and Hungary from before the Pleistocene (i.e. Piacenzian) suggest a more complicated evolutionary and distributional history. A hybrid was recorded in captivity between a male Ural and a female tawny owl, which managed to produce two offspring that were intermediate in size and had a more complex song that was also shared some characteristics with both species' vocalizations.

A number of owls that were considered conspecific with the tawny owl are now widely considered to be separate species as a result of conclusive genetic studies. These consist of the desert or Hume's owl and its sister species, the recently separated and range-restricted Omani owl (Strix butleri) and the little-known Himalayan owl (Strix nivicolum). In all three separated species, there is no evidence that the tawny owl breeds in the same areas as them, making each species allopatric, though the desert and tawny's range nearly abuts in some parts of the Middle East such as northern Israel. Also, in the Western Himalayas, both the tawny and Himalayan owls are known to occur, but there is likely a gap of several hundred kilometers in distribution with tawny mostly restricted to the Pakistani side, whilst the Himalayan is rarely found west of Himachal Pradesh. Furthermore, the desert and Omani species pair and the Himalayan species are considerably different based on superficial appearance (far more so than true tawny owl subspecies), in addition to having distinct voices and appearing to have slightly different nesting habits than tawny owls.

== Subspecies ==
The tawny owl subspecies are often poorly differentiated, and may be at a flexible stage of subspecies formation with features related to the ambient temperature, the color tone of the local habitat, and the size of available prey. Consequently, various authors have historically described between 10 and 15 subspecies. The total number of subspecies was once considered as totaling at 11 subspecies but is now reduced due to the separation of the Himalayan owl and its own further two subspecies down to about eight subspecies. The currently recognised subspecies are listed below.

| Subspecies | Range | Described by (parentheses indicate originally in a different genus) | Description |
|---|---|---|---|
| S. a. aluco | North & Central Europe from southern Scandinavia to the Mediterranean and Black Sea and European Russia | Linnaeus, 1758 | Markedly polymorphic with all three morphs known. Some brown morph individuals bear indistinct concentric lines on the facial disc and tend to have a disc rim is dark brown. Generally, birds of the nominate subspecies are rather pale below with sparser markings and more creamy base colour showing than other European tawny owls. Study of genetic phylogeography of showed that the population of the nominate race in the Balkans originated as a postglacial occupation of northern territories, although these populations do interbreed with populations of two other clines, in the Alps and Pyrenees. This is a medium-sized subspecies. In wing chord males may measure 259 to 286 mm (10.2 to 11.3 in) and females may measure 268 to 298 mm (10.6 to 11.7 in). The tail measures 148 to 166 mm (5.8 to 6.5 in) in males and 154 to 171 mm (6.1 to 6.7 in) in females. In both sexes, the tarsus may measure 45 to 53 mm (1.8 to 2.1 in) and the bill 28.5 to 34.5 mm (1.12 to 1.36 in). Unlike the species overall, the nominate subspecies neatly corresponds to Bergmann's rule (wherein animal are larger farther from the Equator). In northern Italy, the average wing chord in males and females, respectively, was 267 and 274.5 mm (10.51 and 10.81 in) and body mass averaged 445 and 543 g (0.981 and 1.197 lb) in the two sexes. Much farther north in Finland, nominate race owls were notably larger, averaging 275 and 287 mm (10.8 and 11.3 in) in wing chord and 480 and 699 g (1.058 and 1.541 lb) in body mass. Taken as a whole, the nominate includes both the heavier and lightest recorded birds in the tawny owl species. |
| S. a. sylvatica | West Europe including Great Britain and the Iberian Peninsula | Shaw, 1809 | Generally the appearance of S. a. sylvatica is not dissimilar from the nominate subspecies but on average it is more boldly patterned with considerably less white base colour showing below, particularly with a richer average hue in rufous and intermediate morph individuals. More significantly, the main song of this subspecies differs slightly from that of nominate subspecies based on spectrograms. Linearly, this is a fairly small subspecies, averaging around 10% smaller than S. a. aluco, and may include the smallest known tawny owls going on standard measurements. However, average weights do not significantly differ from those of other subspecies with published weights. Wing chord measurements may range from 248 to 280 mm (9.8 to 11.0 in) in males and from 255 to 296 mm (10.0 to 11.7 in) in females. In Spain, the tail could measure 140 to 191 mm (5.5 to 7.5 in), averaging 167.8 mm (6.61 in), the tarsus could measure 47 to 61 mm (1.9 to 2.4 in), averaging 53.85 mm (2.120 in) and the bill could measure 24 to 31 mm (0.94 to 1.22 in), averaging 28.5 mm (1.12 in). Average wing chord in males from England and France were 260.9 and 268 mm (10.27 and 10.55 in) respectively while those of females were 273.6 and 276 mm (10.77 and 10.87 in). Average weights in England and France were 408.6 and 427.8 g (14.41 and 15.09 oz) for 22 and 66 males and 533 and 567 g (1.175 and 1.250 lb) in 20 and 50 females. Live adult weights can range from 335 to 580 g (0.739 to 1.279 lb) in males and 430 to 780 g (0.95 to 1.72 lb). |
| S. a. biddulphi | NW India and Pakistan | Scully, 1881 | This isolated subspecies is fairly distinct for its stark grey morph, with other morphs either rare or non-existent. It has a more stark apparent whitish base colour apparent with a strong grey wash on the head and mantle as well as strong herringbone patterning below. Altogether, it lacks the warmer tones common in more westerly tawny owls and its colouring is not dissimilar from a Ural owl but for the herringbone pattern. Although at times apparently hypothesized as a separate form, most authors continue to retain it as a proper subspecies of tawny owl. Another distinct feature of S. a. biddulphi is its relatively large size and it appears to be the largest bodied race of tawny owl, although published weights are not known. Wing chord in males was found to be 285 to 323 mm (11.2 to 12.7 in) whilst that of females measures 320 to 345 mm (12.6 to 13.6 in). The tail may measure 191 to 210 mm (7.5 to 8.3 in) while a single bird had a tarsal length of 51 mm (2.0 in) and two birds had bill lengths of 33 and 35 mm (1.3 and 1.4 in). |
| S. a. willkonskii | Palestine, Asia Minor to N Iran and the Caucasus up to southeastern Europe | (Menzbier, 1896) | In likelihood, this subspecies includes the formerly described race of S. a. obscurata. On the whole, this race tends to be somewhat more richly coloured than the nominate subspecies. Particularly unique within this subspecies is a dark morph which is somewhat rufous but can grade into an almost coffee brown hue. Although some authors consider this a small subspecies, measurements suggest it is more so of intermediate size. In fact, average sizes may be exceed those of nominate race tawny owls from further north in Europe and the male song may consequently have a slightly deeper tone as well. Wing chord in males may measure 255 to 296 mm (10.0 to 11.7 in) while females may measure 282 to 305 mm (11.1 to 12.0 in). Furthermore, weight of one male S. a. willkonskii was 510 g (1.12 lb) while one female weighed 582 g (1.283 lb). |
| S. a. mauritanica | NW Africa from Morocco to Tunisia and Mauritania | (Witherby, 1905) | This race is a rather dark grey-brown with no evidence of morph colour variation. It is slightly dull, cooler and more uniform hue overall than S. a. aluco or S. a. sylvatica. Study of genetic materials, including phylogeography, and the species dispersal behaviour, supports the division of S. a. maurtanica from the European subspecies, and it may even form its own species, with the Strait of Gibraltar as a natural gap between the ranges. Although sometimes suggested as about 5% smaller than S. a. aluco, current data suggest it is of similar size to Italian nominate owls and Spanish S. a. sylvatica found on the other side of the Mediterranean. Standard measurements of both sexes are known to be 272 to 305 mm (10.7 to 12.0 in) in wing chord length, 173 to 189 mm (6.8 to 7.4 in) in tail length, 54 to 61 mm (2.1 to 2.4 in) in tarsal length and 28 to 31 mm (1.1 to 1.2 in) in bill length. Weight of males has been reported at 325 to 470 g (11.5 to 16.6 oz) whilst that of females at 390 to 575 g (0.860 to 1.268 lb). |
| S. a. sanctinicolai | W Iran, NE Iraq | (Zarudny, 1905) | This little known subspecies is apparently a rather pale and washed-out form, as excepted for a species that lives in subdesert region. Although the only known measurements obtained have been of wing chord it appears to be one of the smaller forms of the tawny owl. Males may measure from 255 to 273 mm (10.0 to 10.7 in) and females have been known to measure 270 to 285 mm (10.6 to 11.2 in). |
| S. a. harmsi | The area once known as Turkestan, which today includes portions of six various countries. | (Zarudny, 1911) | This is a relatively dark hued form, which may be in some way intermediate with the Himalayan owl based on colouring but is still considered part of the tawny owl species. This race is quite large based on wing chord dimensions, and may rival S. a. biddulphi as the largest form of tawny owl. Measurements for males are 303 to 316 mm (11.9 to 12.4 in) while females they are 318 to 332 mm (12.5 to 13.1 in). |
| S. a. siberiae | C Russia from the Urals to about the Irtysh river in Western Siberia | Dementiev, 1933 | This race is paler still than the nominate race with a large amount of dazzling white apparent on the sparsely marked underside, which tends to bare relatively few crossbars. This is a relatively large subspecies, being fairly similar in size to the nominate birds from Scandinavia. This race is up to 12% larger than Central European nominate birds. Wing chord may measure from 280 to 300 mm (11 to 12 in) in males and from 301 to 311 mm (11.9 to 12.2 in) in females. A single owl measured 175 mm (6.9 in) in tail length and 33 mm (1.3 in) in bill length. Unexpectedly, the reported weights for S. a. siberiae are not high relative to most reported in Europe and come in at a similar range as those reported for linearly rather smaller populations such as S. a. sylvatica in France. Reported body mass for S. a. siberiae is 450 to 490 g (0.99 to 1.08 lb) in males and 590 to 680 g (1.30 to 1.50 lb) in females. |
