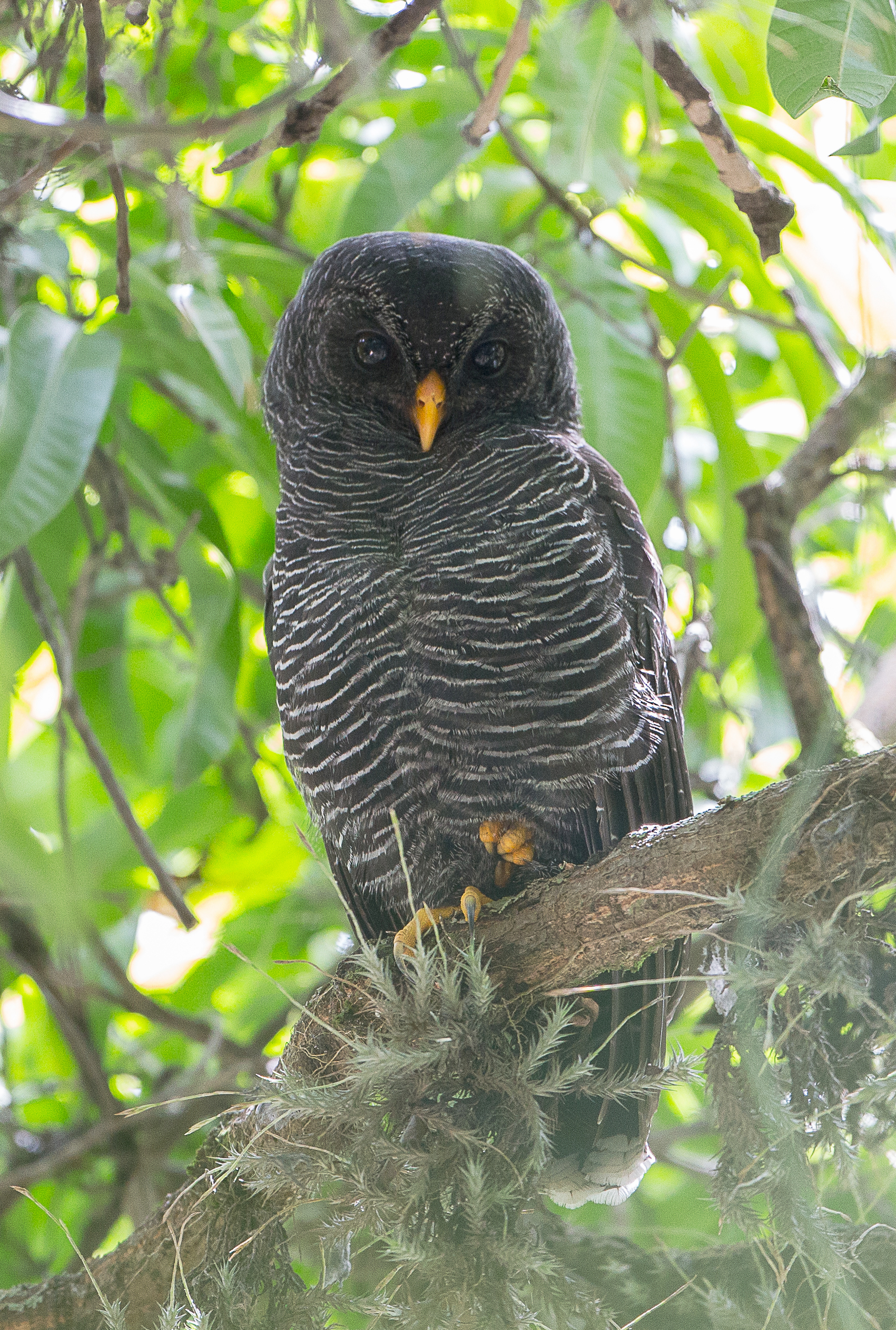

Conservation status
- Least Concern (IUCN 3.1)
- CITES Appendix II

Scientific classification
- Kingdom: Animalia
- Phylum: Chordata
- Class: Aves
- Order: Strigiformes
- Family: Strigidae
- Genus: Strix
- Species: S. huhula

Binomial name
- Strix huhula Daudin, 1800

Synonyms
- Ciccaba huhula

= Black-banded owl =

Species of owl

The black-banded owl (Strix huhula) is a species of owl in the family Strigidae. Entirely nocturnal, this midsized black and white neotropical bird is a resident species, and therefore never migrates out of its native South America. Its natural habitats are varied subtropical or tropical forests ranging from lowlands to areas of medium altitude, and it has been found in Argentina, Bolivia, Brazil, Colombia, Ecuador, French Guiana, Guyana, Paraguay, Peru, Suriname, and Venezuela.

== Description ==
The black-banded owl is medium-sized (30–36 cm (12–14 in)), blackish all over and densely striated with horizontal, wavy, white bars. A black face mask encircle its eyes. It has a rounded head with no ear tufts, and a yellow-orange bill and feet. The tail is sooty-brown, with 4 to 5 narrow white bars and a white terminal band. Primary feathers are significantly darker than the rest of its plumage. Black bristles and feathers are found around the bill and along the leg to the base of the toes.

== Taxonomy ==
The taxonomy of the black-banded owl is unclear on several points. Some authors include it in the genus Ciccaba, (medium-sized wood owls found in South-America) along with the black-and-white Owl (Ciccaba nigrolineata), mottled Owl (Ciccaba virgata), and rufous-banded Owl (Ciccaba albitarsis). However, others include all Ciccaba species to the genus Strix. Furthermore, there is some debate on whether or not the black-banded Owl and the black-and-white owl are the same species. Some posit they are, due to their vocalizations being alike and the fact that they respond to the other's calls. Others claim that they are unlikely to be the same species, seeing as the vocalizations of Black-banded and Black-and-white owls are different even when their range is overlapping.

There are two recognized subspecies;

- S. h. huhula who is distributed mostly in northern and central South-America.
- S. h. albomarginata who inhabits mainly south-eastern Brazil, eastern Paraguay and the adjacent areas of north-eastern Argentina.

== Habitat and distribution ==
=== Habitat ===
Black-banded owls are mostly found below an elevation of 500 m (2,000 ft), with rare records of them at up to 1,400 m (5,000 ft). They inhabit various types of forests throughout the South-American landscape, mostly tropical and subtropical forests. In Ecuador they were almost exclusively recorded in the humid forest of the North-East, they were also found in the Atlantic, igapò, and terra-firme forests of Brazil, Araucaria forests, and man-made or disturbed habitats, such as clearings, agricultural land and suburban areas.

=== Distribution ===
The black-banded owl is difficult to detect and is one of the least known Strigidae in South-America. Their population size has not been assessed, but it is described as a relatively common bird, although it is patchily distributed. Few sightings have been recorded, but their range extends in all likelihood from the south of Colombia to south-eastern Argentina and Brazil.

The difficulty in detecting the black-banded owl is well illustrated by the fact that S. h. albomarginata has only been found a handful of times in recent years in the Atlantic forest of Brasil and Paraguay, and only twice until 2012 in the Ecuadorian Podocarpus National Park. In the region of Minas Gerais, Brazil, a black banded owl was only sighted a second time 170 years after it was first recorded. Similarly, only historical reports without supporting evidence existed in Paraguay before 1995. This species was also found to be the least abundant of large owls in the Misiones province of Argentina.

== Behaviour ==
=== Vocalization ===
The song of the male black-banded owl consists of a phrase of changing hoots. The typical rhythm is composed of 3-4 deep guttural notes, followed by a pause of about 0.6 seconds, and ending with one or two louder and shorter hoots. This wobobo whúo or wobobo whúo hú song increases gradually in volume and pitch. The female sings a slightly higher-pitched version of this.

Many new vocalizations are heard during the nesting period, including 2 types of screeches and new calls. Around the nest, males have been recorded calling to their mate with six or seven descending notes with females answering with the same call or with 1-, 2-, or 3-notes. This descending call was only heard during nesting, but the 1-, 2-, or 3-note call was heard in other circumstances.

=== Diet ===
Little information is available on the food habits of this species, but bats have been found in the stomachs of adult birds and they have been observed eating and feeding moths to their nestlings.

The black-and-white owl, the closest relative of the black-banded owl, has been seen capturing large insects, such as beetles (mostly scarabaeid, curculionid and cerambycid), grasshoppers (Acrididae), and cockroaches (Blattidae). As for vertebrate prey, they fed on bats (primarily Artibeus jamaicens) while Mottled Owls, another Ciccaba species, ate predominantly small rodents.

=== Reproduction ===
Not much is known either on the reproduction of black-banded owls. The first description of nesting was reported in 2013. It reported that during the incubation period, from September to November, the egg was incubated all day and almost all night, being left alone only for short bouts of 5–10 min. The same behaviour was observed for at least three weeks following hatching. It is assumed that the female did all the incubation and brooding, congruous with all other owl species studied so far. Both parents actively defended their nest, and the breeding pair most likely excluded other owl species from the center of their territory.

Similar to other Ciccaba and Strix owls, the black-banded owl has a clutch size of one nestling, and the nest was situated among forked branches and not in a cavity. Black-banded owls can use the same tree fork for their nest in following years, however they may not breed consecutively.
