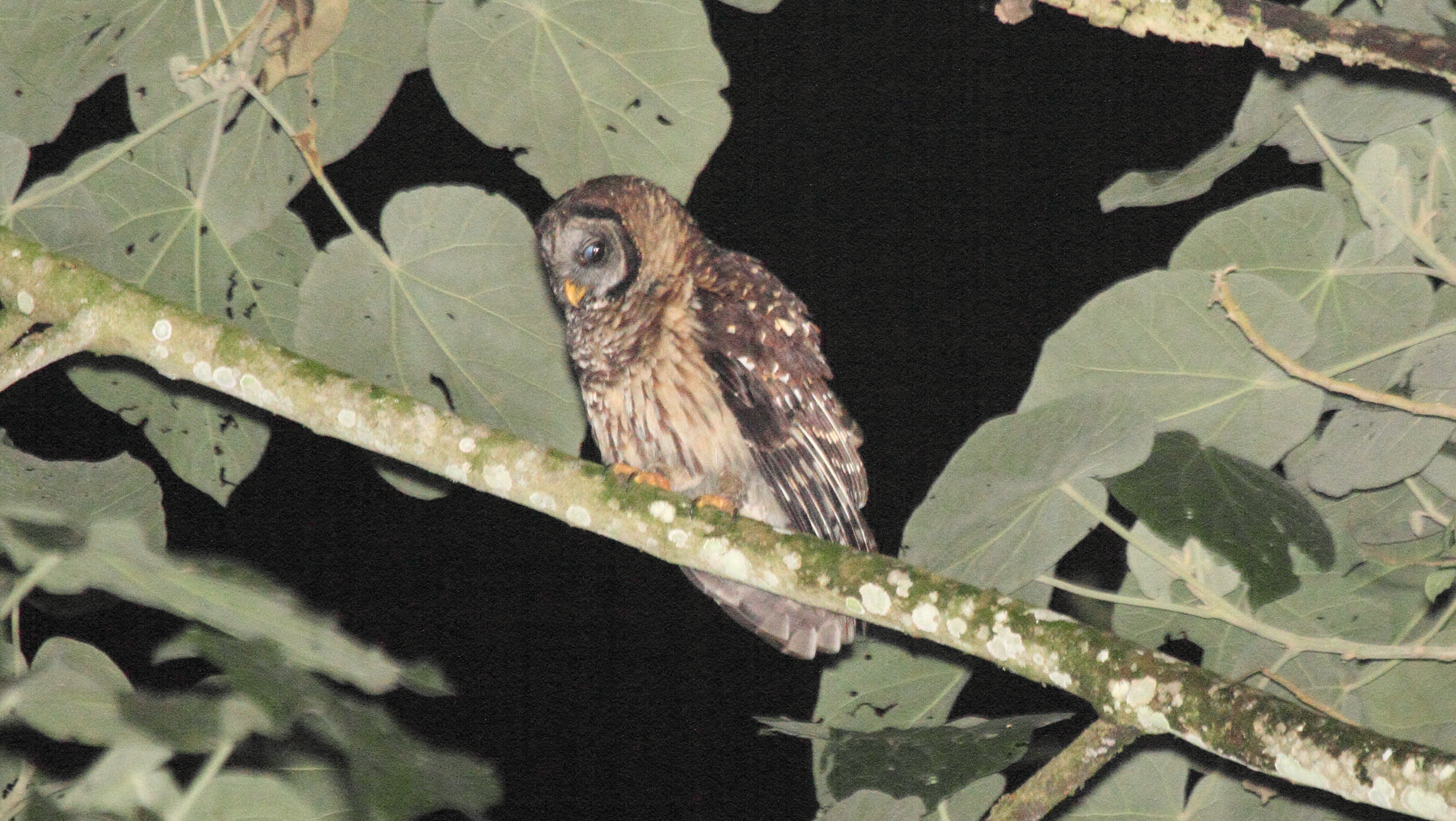

Conservation status
- Least Concern (IUCN 3.1)
- CITES Appendix II

Scientific classification
- Kingdom: Animalia
- Phylum: Chordata
- Class: Aves
- Order: Strigiformes
- Family: Strigidae
- Genus: Strix
- Species: S. fulvescens

Binomial name
- Strix fulvescens (Sclater, PL & Salvin, 1868)

= Fulvous owl =

Species of owl

The fulvous owl (Strix fulvescens), or Guatemala barred owl, is a resident of the cloud forests of Central America. A medium-sized true owl, it has a round head, lacking ear tufts. Its typical coloration is warm dark brown or reddish brown on the back and lighter brown on the front with darker barring. Adults weigh approximately 600 grams (21 oz), with females being heavier. Its distribution is limited to highland regions of Guatemala, Honduras, and El Salvador. It inhabits elevations from 1,200 to 3,100 meters (3,900 to 10,200 ft), and is fairly common within its range. Its behavior is poorly known, as are its population size and distribution. It is classified as a species of least concern by the International Union for Conservation of Nature, although it is considered endangered in Mexico.

== Taxonomy and systematics ==
The fulvous owl is a monotypic species in the genus Strix. It is a member of the true owl family, Strigidae. It was formally described in 1868, as Syrnium fulvescens. The type specimen came from Guatemala. In 1970 it was classified as a subspecies of the barred owl (Strix varia), but it is generally recognized as a separate species today, although some researchers consider it part of a superspecies, along with the barred owl and possibly the spotted owl (Strix occidentalis). The fulvous owl is sometimes known as the Guatemalan barred owl.

== Description ==
The fulvous owl is a medium-sized owl with a round head. It lacks the ear tufts found in many other owls. Its length is variously described as between 41 and 44 centimetres (16 1/8 and 17 3/8 in), between 38 and 48.5 centimetres (15 and 19 1/8 in), and between 40.5 and 45 centimetres (16 and 17 3/4 in). Measured wing lengths for the species range between 30 and 33.3 centimetres (11 3/4 and 13 1/8 in), while tail length ranges between 18.5 and 21 centimetres (7 1/4 and 8 1/4 in), and the bill length between 22.5 and 24.5 millimetres (7/8 and 31/32 in). Adults weigh approximately 600 grams (21 oz), with females on average being 100 grams (3.5 oz) heavier.

The facial disc of the species is a dull brownish-white or pale ochre in color, and is slightly darker around the eyes. The disc has concentric dark brown bars around it, and short white eyebrows. The crown, the nape of the neck, and the upperparts of the species are a rich, warm dark brown or reddish brown. The crown and the neck have scalloped markings in a lighter shade. The upperparts of the bird are covered by sparse bars colored "ochraceous buff", that become smaller and less regular on the scapulars, lower back, and rump. The wing coverts have small pale brown markings, while the greater and median coverts have a white spot near the base. The primaries have big spots ranging from whitish to pale brown. The secondaries have five or six light brown bands. The underparts of the bird are shades of light brown, with dark brown or reddish-brown streaks. The undertail coverts are buff colored, with some dark streaks on the longest feathers. The bill and the cere are yellowish in color. The legs are covered in reddish-brown feathering till the toes, which are yellowish. The claws are horn-colored with dark tips. The iris is dark brown.

Sexes are alike in the fulvous owl. Chicks are whitish, while juveniles are cinnamon-brown with yellowish or white barring and a brownish facial disc. The species is visually most similar to the barred owl, found in Mexico, Canada, and the United States. The barred owl is more gray above and more white below. The fulvous owl is approximately one-fifth smaller than the Mexican variant of the barred owl. The mottled owl (Ciccaba virgata) has a similar range as the fulvous owl, but is found only at lower altitudes. It is darker brown and smaller, while the facial disc is dark with a white edge, as opposed to light with a dark edge in the fulvous owl.

== Distribution and habitat ==
The fulvous owl is found in highland regions in the Mexican states of Chiapas and Oaxaca, Guatemala, Honduras, and El Salvador. Its existence in Oaxaca was reported in 1950, but locations from which the specimens were collected had been challenged. The species was confirmed to exist in Oaxaca in 2011. Its range is poorly known, but thought to be large. A montane species, it is found at altitudes between 1,200 and 3,100 meters (3,900 and 10,200 ft) above sea level. The species is found in montane evergreen pine forests and humid pine-oak forests, and more generally within a cloud forest habitat. The International Union for Conservation of Nature estimates that the population of the species is between 20,000 and 50,000 individuals, although the population is suspected to be declining as a result of habitat loss. As a result of its large range and substantial population, it is classified as a species of least concern by the IUCN. The species is estimated to have declined by half in Mexico over the last century as a result of habitat loss, and the Mexican government consider it an endangered species. The species was traditionally considered a messenger of death in parts of Mexico.

== Behavior and ecology ==
The call of the fulvous owl is described as a loud barking hoot, rendered as "who-wuhu-woot-woot" or "a'hoo a'hoo-hoo a'hoo, hoo": the number of notes is variable. The rhythm of the call has been likened to that of Morse code. The call of the female is higher in pitch, and is sometimes uttered in a duet with the male. The call lacks the terminal note of the barred owl call. Other vocalizations uttered by the species have been described as "parrot-like, nasal gwao calls, singly or in series, as well as single hoots". The species is nocturnal, though it occasionally calls during the day, and hunts from a perch. Its diet is poorly known. It likely consists of rodents, large insects, birds, frogs, and lizards. The stomach of a dissected specimen was found to contain "large insects". An individual was observed attempting to catch a highland guan, while the feathers of a blue-throated motmot were found below the nest of another.

The fulvous owl does not migrate. Very little information exists about the behavior of this species. It is presumed to be monogamous, as with most owl species. Young of the species have been observed in May. The incubation period is between 28 and 30 days long, and the number of eggs in a clutch varies between two and five, but generally is either two or three. Nests are usually made in holes or cavities in trees. Females incubate the eggs, and males are thought to forage for the females and young.
