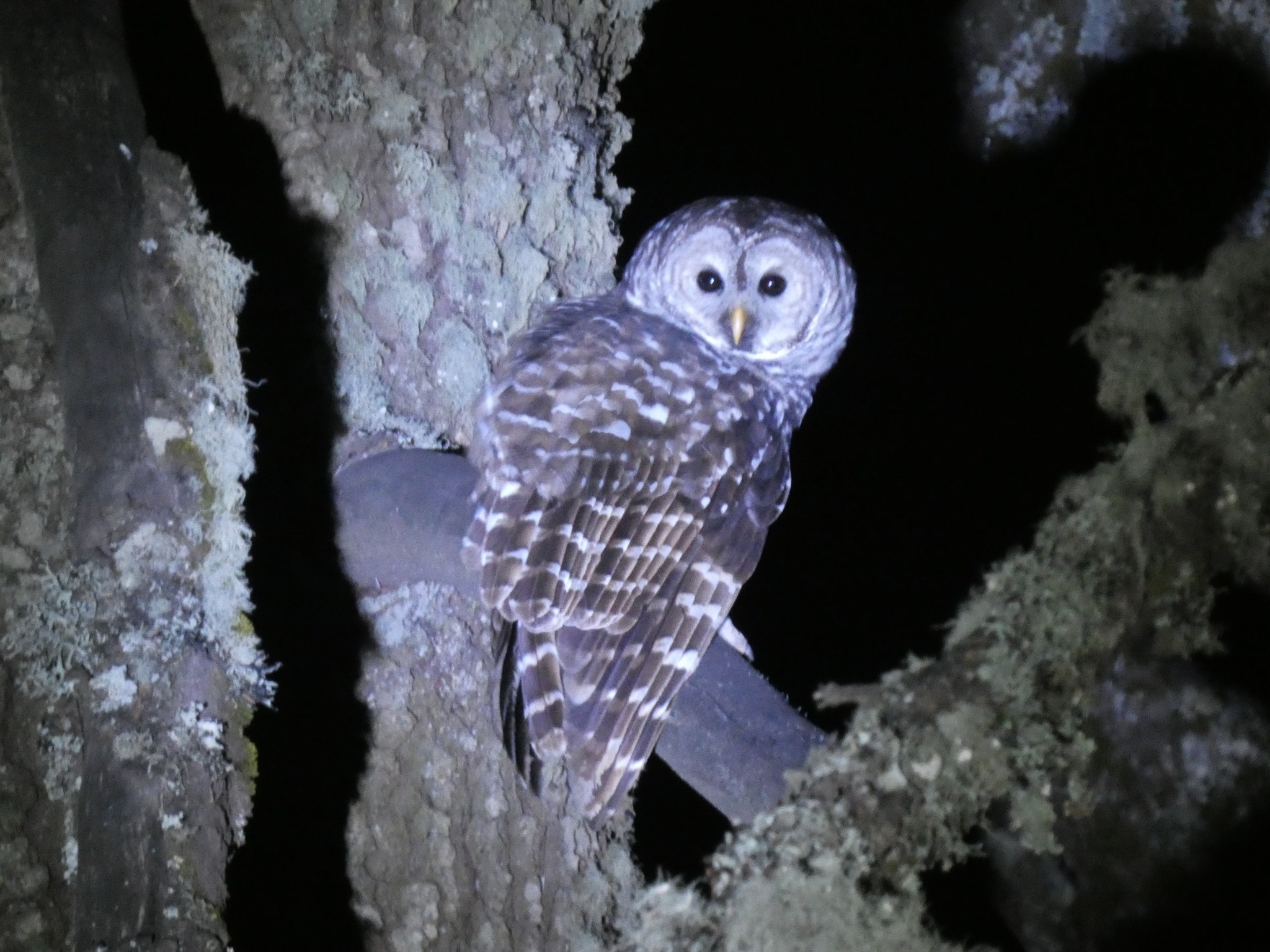

Conservation status
- CITES Appendix II

Scientific classification
- Kingdom: Animalia
- Phylum: Chordata
- Class: Aves
- Order: Strigiformes
- Family: Strigidae
- Genus: Strix
- Species: S. sartorii

Binomial name
- Strix sartorii (Ridgway, 1874)

= Cinereous owl =

Species of owl

The cinereous owl (Strix sartorii), or Mexican barred owl, is a species of owl that is endemic to Mexico.

== Taxonomy and systematics ==
The cinereous owl has historically often been considered a subspecies of barred owl (Strix varia), sometimes along with the fulvous owl (Strix fulvescens). However, since 2010, vocal and genetic differences have been shown to warrant its treatment as a species in its own right, according to the International Ornithological Committee (IOC) and the Clements taxonomy. However, as of December 2020 the BirdLife International Handbook of the Birds of the World retains it as a subspecies of barred owl.

== Description ==
Very few specimens of cinereous owl have been measured. The limited number of measurements indicate lengths between 43.0 and 50.5 cm (1.411 and 1.657 ft), male weights between 469 and 812 g (1.034 and 1.790 lb), and female weights between 610 and 1,051 g (1.345 and 2.317 lb). This large round-headed owl's upperparts are brownish gray with whitish to buff bars. It has grayish white to brownish gray facial disks surrounded by darker brown and buffy bars. Its underparts are pale buff to white with dark streaks.

== Distribution ==
The cinerous owl appears to occur in three disjunct areas. The largest is along the Sierra Madre Oriental between San Luis Potosi in the north and Veracruz in the south. The next largest is a band from Durango south to Michoacán and the third is a relatively small area in Guerrero. It is believed to formerly have occurred in Oaxaca.

== Behavior ==
=== Feeding ===
Little is known about the cinereous owl's foraging strategy or diet, but both are assumed to be similar to that of the barred owl. That species is semi-nocturnal to nocturnal and is an opportunistic predator on small mammals and lagomorphs, small birds, reptiles, and invertebrates.

=== Breeding ===
The only information about the cinereous owl's breeding phenology comes from the observation of a fledgling of unknown age in Nayarit in early June. It had well-developed flight feathers but downy body plumage.

=== Vocalization ===
The first recordings of the cinereous owl's vocalizations were made in 2015 and very few since then. It has a variety of hoots and other calls.

== Status ==
The IUCN has not assessed the status of the cinereous owl, and "every aspect of the biology of Cinereous Owl is in dire need of more research."
