= Alasio =

Alasio Temporal range: Middle Miocene

Scientific classification
- Kingdom: Animalia
- Phylum: Chordata
- Class: Aves
- Order: Strigiformes
- Family: Strigidae
- Subfamily: Striginae
- Tribe: Asionini
- Genus: †Alasio; Mlíkovský, 1998

Type species
- †Strix collongensis Ballman, 1972

Extinct genus of owls

Alasio is an extinct genus of typical owls known from material dated to the Middle Miocene of Vieux-Collonges, France. The holotype, a coracoid, was originally assigned to genus Strix under the protonym Strix collongensis. The modified head of the coracoid, among several anatomical characteristics, led Mlíkovský to designate Alasio as a new genus in tribe Asionini. The generic name derives from Latin alacer ("pugnacious") and asio ("owl").
