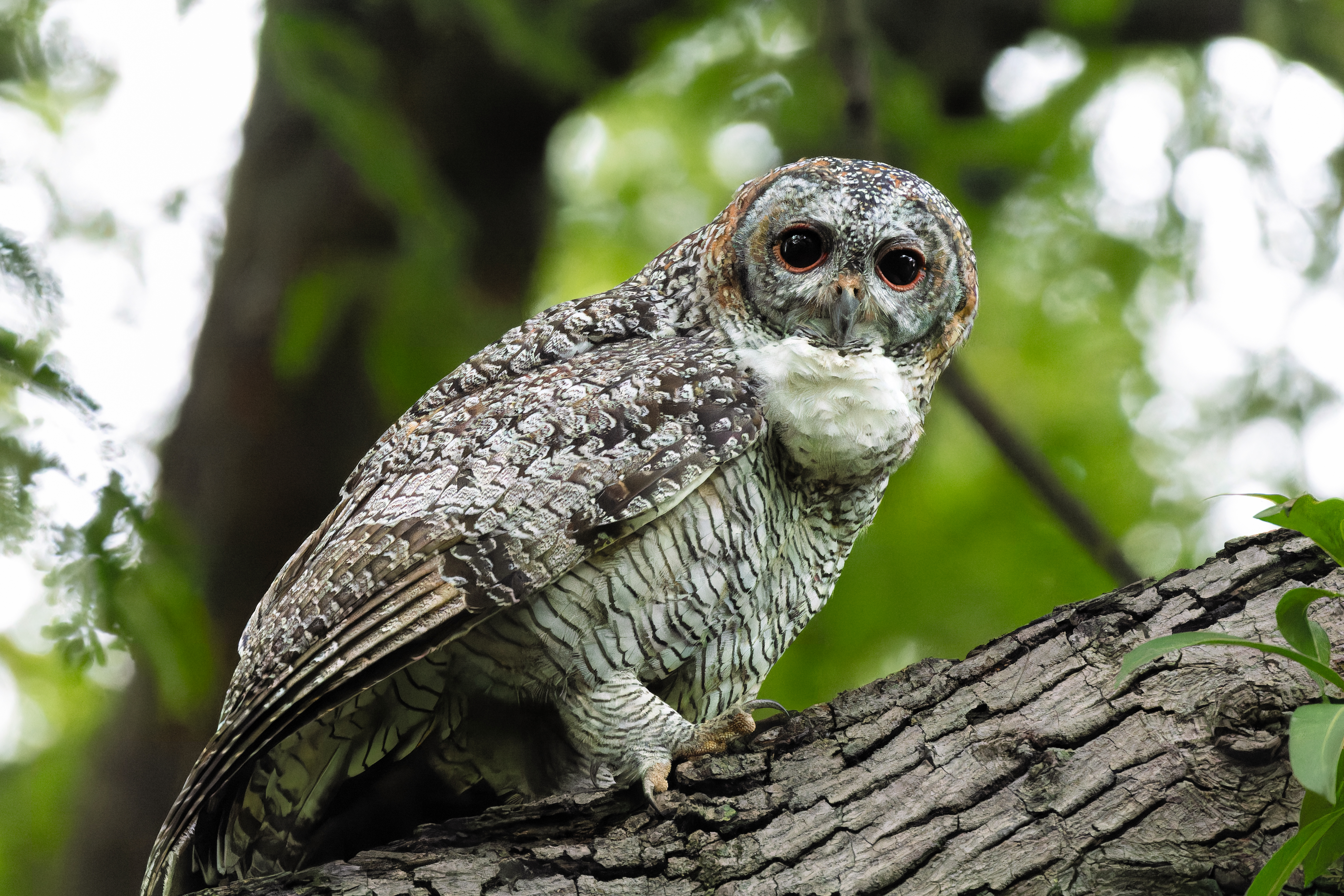
- In Bhigwan, Maharashtra, India.

Conservation status
- Least Concern (IUCN 3.1)
- CITES Appendix II

Scientific classification
- Kingdom: Animalia
- Phylum: Chordata
- Class: Aves
- Order: Strigiformes
- Family: Strigidae
- Genus: Strix
- Species: S. ocellata

Binomial name
- Strix ocellata (Lesson, 1839)

Synonyms
- Syrnium ocellatum Bulaca ocellata

= Mottled wood owl =

Species of owl

The mottled wood owl (Strix ocellata) is a species of large owl found in India and Nepal. They are found in gardens and thin deciduous forests adjacent to dry thorn forests or farmland. They are easily detected by their distinctive tremulous, eerie calls at dawn and dusk. The characteristic call is a duet of the male and female, while other notes include a low hoot and a screech. Their large size, lack of "ear" tufts and the concentric barring on the face make them easy to identify.

== Description ==
This large owl lacks ear tufts and is mottled and vermiculated in reddish brown and white. The face disc is marked with fine concentric black and white barring. The sexes are alike. The chin is white. The eyelid is orange, and the iris is dark brown. The tail is barred narrowly in brown and black. The concentric barring on the face and mottled crown separate it from the brown wood owl in southern India.

There are three subspecies recognized and there are no sharp demarcations in their distributions.

- S. o. ocellata (Lesson, 1839) is found in southern India and is shorter winged in the males (333–338 mm) than grandis
- S. o. grisescens Koelz, 1950 is found in northern India south of the Himalayas, west to Pakistan and east to Bihar. The markings are pale above and the males have a wing length of 338–346 mm
- S. o. grandis Koelz, 1950 from Gujarat is differentiated by the wing length of the males (360–372 mm)

== Distribution and habitat ==
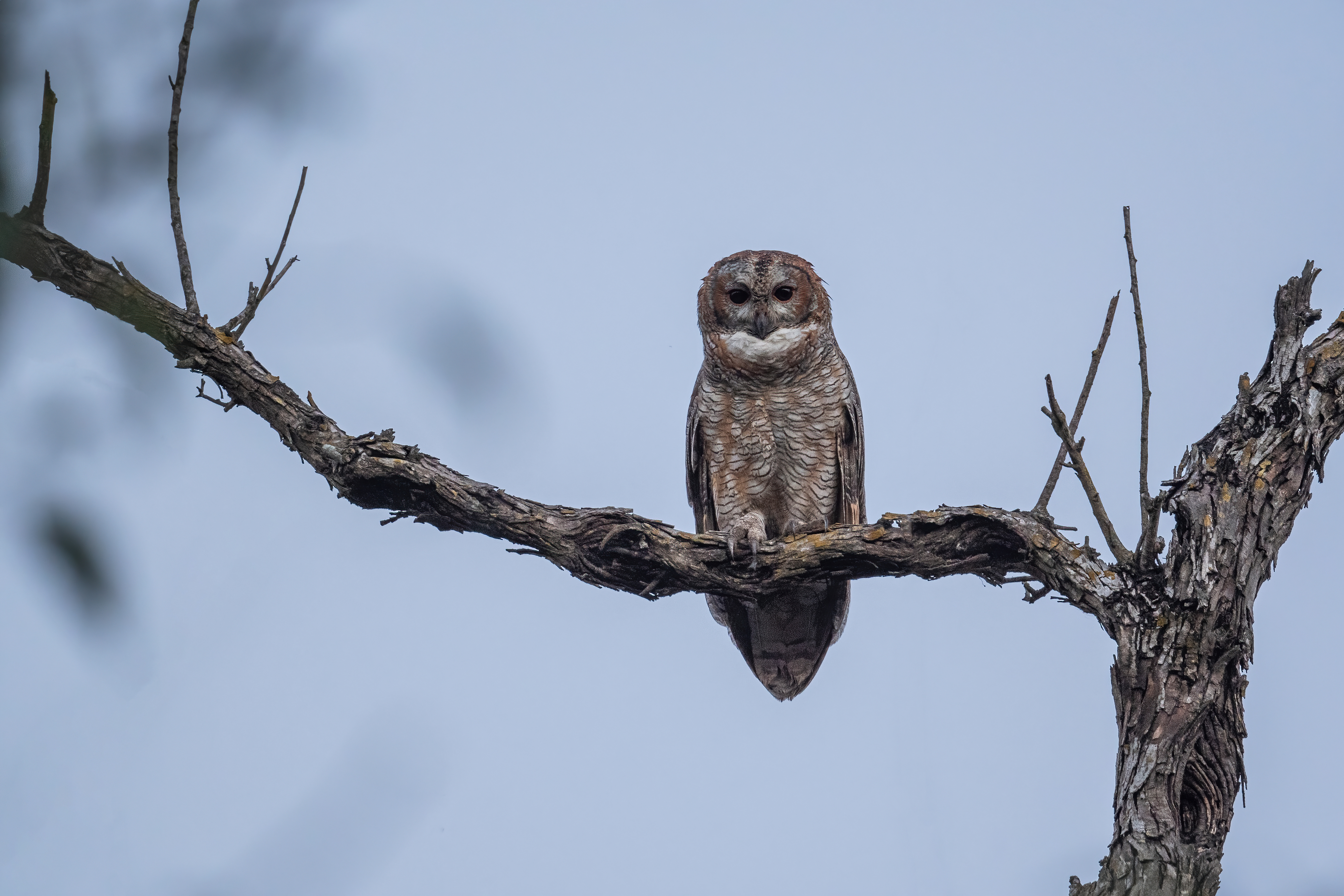
Mottled Wood-owl at Bardiya, Nepal.

The species is found in the plains in gardens and lightly wooded habitats. They roost in trees during the day, choosing a branch with dense foliage. An old specimen from Lahore is noted, but no records in recent times from Pakistan. The distribution extends east to West Bengal. They are also seen in various parts of India.

== Behaviour and ecology ==
These owls roost during the day, usually in pairs. When disturbed they may fly in bright sunshine, although they choose to shelter within a dense grove of trees. They produce an eerie chuhua-aa call with a quaver in the second note. This call is an antiphonal duet of the male and female. The male calls one or two times followed by the female's shorter and less tremulous version. The calling is more frequent in November when they begin to breed. Most Nests are found from February to April. They also produce a single note hoot and a screech not unlike that of the barn owl. The nest is a tree hollow in which two to three white eggs are laid. They feed on palm squirrels, mice and other small mammals.

== In culture ==
The call of the mottled wood owl is considered a bad omen in folklore of Kerala, India. The call is said to sound like the Malayalam expression povaa-aa ("let us go"), and likened to calling upon the spirit world. In Malayalam, this species is therefore called Kālan-kozhi (lit. 'fowl of death'). (Note: Kālan is the commonly used Malayalam word for Yama, the Hindu deity of death.)
