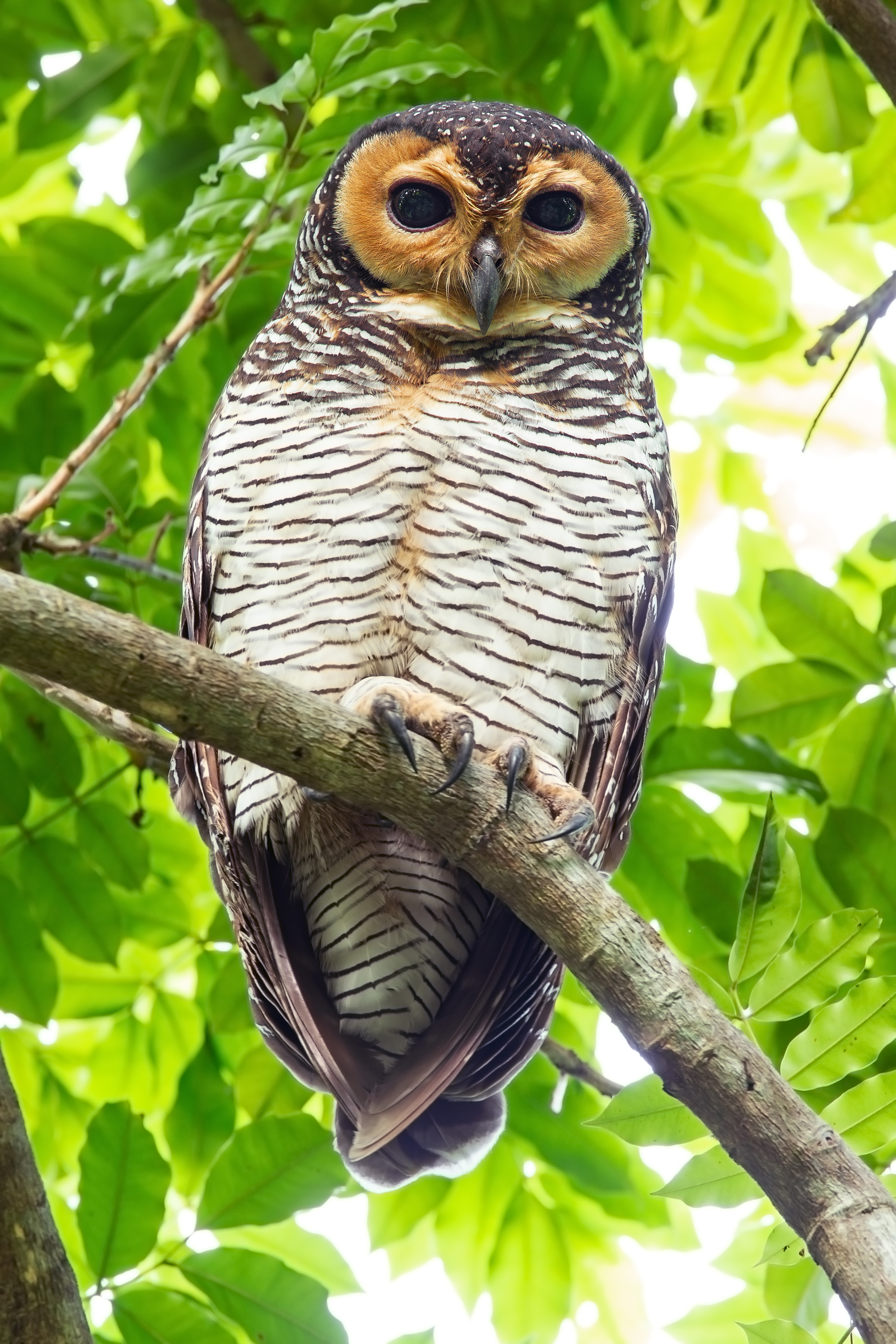
- Pasir Ris Park, Singapore

Conservation status
- Least Concern (IUCN 3.1)
- CITES Appendix II

Scientific classification
- Kingdom: Animalia
- Phylum: Chordata
- Class: Aves
- Order: Strigiformes
- Family: Strigidae
- Genus: Strix
- Species: S. seloputo

Binomial name
- Strix seloputo Horsfield, 1821

Synonyms
- Strix orientalis; Strix pagodorum; Strix Selo-puto Horsfield, 1821 (old orthography); Surnia whiteheadi

= Spotted wood owl =

Species of owl

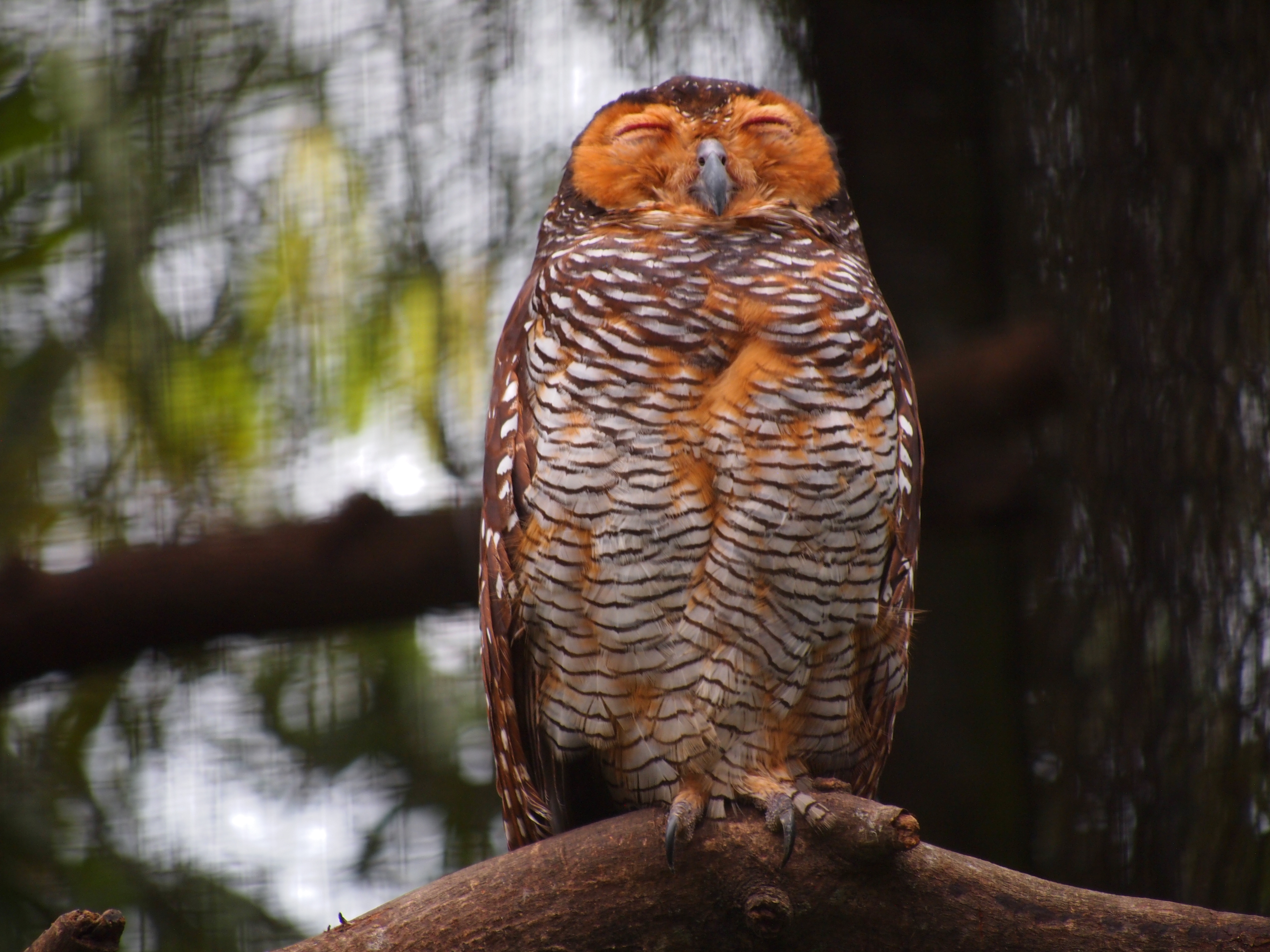
Spotted wood owl at National Zoo Malaysia

The spotted wood owl (Strix seloputo) is an owl of the earless owl genus, Strix. Its range is disjunct; it occurs in many regions surrounding Borneo, but not on that island itself.

== Description ==
The spotted wood owl grows to a length of about 44 to 48 cm (17 to 19 in) with a wing length of 30 to 36 cm (12 to 14 in). The head is chocolate brown with an orangish-buff facial disc and, in the nominate subspecies, a yellowish throat band, but there are no ear-tufts. The upper parts are coffee-coloured, with white bars and spots edged with black. The underparts are dull yellow with broad white and narrow black bars. The eye is dark brown and the beak greenish-black. The legs and toes are well-feathered, with the visible parts being olive. The call is a rolling "huhuhu" followed by a long "whoo".

== Distribution and habitat ==
There are three subspecies: S. s. seloputo occurs in South Myanmar and central Thailand to Singapore as well as Jambi (Sumatra) and Java; S. s. baweana is endemic to the island of Bawean off North Java; S. s. wiepkini occurs in the Calamian Islands and Palawan (Philippines). Typical habitats include lowland forest, mangrove swamps, cleared woodland, plantations, and parks in towns and villages.

== Ecology ==
The diet of this owl consists mainly of mice and rats, supplemented by insects and small birds.

== Status ==
The spotted wood owl has a very wide range, and is described as being common in some areas. The population size has not been quantified but it seems to be stable, and the International Union for Conservation of Nature has assessed the bird's conservation status as being of "least concern".
