= Rufous-banded owl =

Conservation status
- Least Concern (IUCN 3.1)
- CITES Appendix II

Scientific classification
- Kingdom: Animalia
- Phylum: Chordata
- Class: Aves
- Order: Strigiformes
- Family: Strigidae
- Genus: Strix
- Species: S. albitarsis

Binomial name
- Strix albitarsis (Bonaparte, 1850)

Synonyms
- Ciccaba albitarsis Strix albitarsus Ciccaba albitarsus

Species of owl

The rufous-banded owl (Strix albitarsis) is a species of owl in the family Strigidae. It is found in Bolivia, Colombia, Ecuador, Peru, and Venezuela.

== Taxonomy and systematics ==
The International Ornithological Committee (IOC) places the rufous-banded owl in genus Strix and divides it into three subspecies, the nominate S. a. albitarsis, S. a. opaca, and S. a. tertia. However, the South American Classification Committee of the American Ornithological Society (SACC/AOS), the Clements taxonomy, and BirdLife International's Handbook of the Birds of the World (HBW) assign it to genus Ciccaba. Even more confusingly, HBW agrees with the assignment of three subspecies but Clements considers the species to be monotypic.

== Description ==
The rufous-banded owl is 30 to 35 cm (12 to 14 in) long; two specimens weighed 265 and 350 g (9.3 and 12.3 oz). It has a round head and no ear tufts. Adults have a rufous facial disk that is blacker around the orange eyes, white "brows", and white lores. The rest of the head and the upperparts are blackish brown with buffy rufous bars and spots. The tail is also blackish brown, with lighter bars. The chest is dark brown with whitish and tawny bars and spots. The rest of the underparts are silvery white and rufous brown in an ocellated () pattern. The juvenile is buffy with a blackish mask.

== Distribution and habitat ==
The rufous-banded owl is found in the Andes from northern Venezuela south to western and southern Bolivia. The IOC places the nominate subspecies in Venezuela, Colombia, and Ecuador; S. a. opaca in Peru, and S. a. tertia in Bolivia. The species inhabits humid evergreen montane forest and cloudforest that have a dense understory, epiphytes, and mosses. In Venezuela it has also been recorded in more open areas adjoining dense forest. In elevation it ranges from about 1,700 to 3,700 m (5,600 to 12,100 ft).

== Behavior ==
=== Feeding ===
The rufous-banded owl is nocturnal and becomes active soon after dark. It forages in the forest canopy and has been reported to forage from perches at the edge of forest. Its diet has not been studied but is probably insects and small mammals.

=== Breeding ===
Almost nothing is known about the rufous-banded owl's breeding phenology. A recently fledged bird was found in late June in Colombia and a juvenile was seen in August in Venezuela.

=== Vocalization ===
The rufous-banded owl's primary vocalization is a "[f]ast series of 5–10 short, deep, guttural notes followed by brief pause and then an explosive higher-pitched note: 'hu hu hu hu hu, HOOa', or 'hu hu hu hu hu hu hu hu hu hu, HOOa'". It also calls a "series of gruff single hoots: 'rrroo rrroo rrroo rrroo...'".

== Status ==
The IUCN has assessed the rufous-banded owl as being of Least Concern. However, it is "[p]robably adversely affected by cutting of [its] forest habitat."
