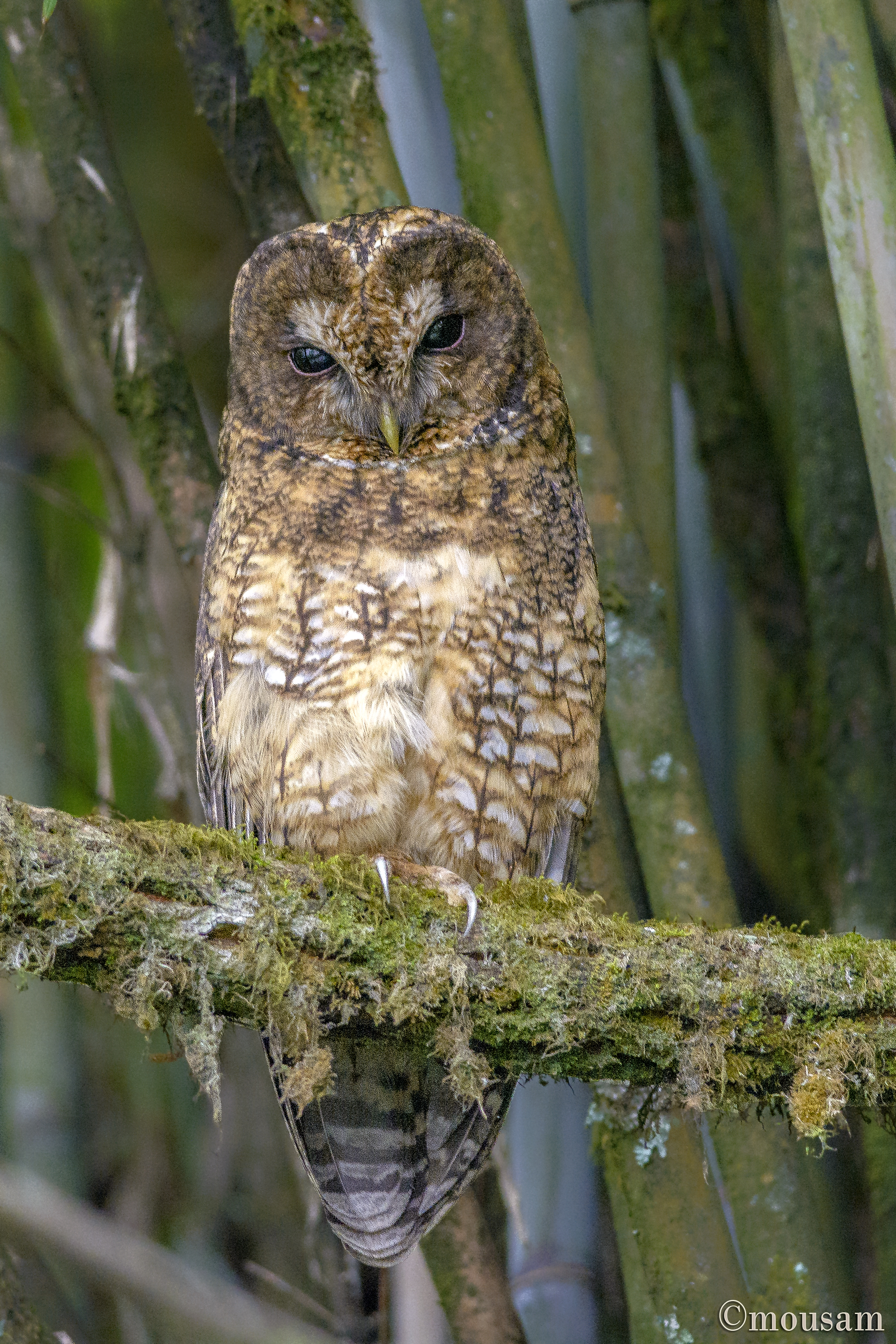

Conservation status
- Least Concern (IUCN 3.1)

Scientific classification
- Kingdom: Animalia
- Phylum: Chordata
- Class: Aves
- Order: Strigiformes
- Family: Strigidae
- Genus: Strix
- Species: S. nivicolum

Binomial name
- Strix nivicolum (Blyth, 1845)

= Himalayan owl =

Species of owl

The Himalayan owl or Himalayan wood owl (Strix nivicolum) is a medium-sized owl native to the forests and mountain ranges of the Himalayas, Taiwan and Korea. Although populations are declining, this owl is not considered endangered and is currently listed as a species of Least Concern on the IUCN Red List due to its large range and slow decline. The Himalayan owl is nocturnal and is rarely seen in most areas of its range. Few studies have been done on its lifestyle and current population trends.

== Description ==
The Himalayan owl measures 35–40 cm and has a wingspan of approximately 270mm, classifying it as a medium-sized owl. The Himalayan Owl has warm-toned, tawny-coloured, plumage with light brown, dark brown and white colouring across its body. Its chest is light brown and white with vertical dark brown stripes, while its wings and tail feathers are darker with white horizontal bands and light patches towards the tips. Its head is round and without ear tufts and is a dark brown colour with lighter speckling, similar to its wings. The Himalayan owl has a small, hooked, yellow beak located around half an inch under its eyes in the center of its paler coloured face. Unlike many bird species, males and female Himalayan owls are morphologically similar, and cannot be differentiated by appearance. The juvenile Himalayan Owl appears similar to the adult yet is distinguished by slight white barring on the dark crown of its head.

== Taxonomy ==
The Himalayan owl is part of the Strigidae family, within the Genus Strix. Once considered a subspecies of the tawny owl, Strix nivicolum is now considered its own species due to its genetic diversity, geographic differences, darker plumage, shorter tail and distinct call. The Himalayan owl has 3 subspecies that are distinguished by their geographic location and minor differences in appearance.

=== Strix nivocolum nivicolum ===
Strix nivicolum nivicolum is the first subspecies of the Himalayan owl. S. n. nivicolum is a subspecies found near the Himalayas with its range comprising northern Pakistan, northern India, Tibet, Bhutan, Nepal and northern Myanmar. This subspecies was originally called the Bengal tawny owl and was the first of the 3 subspecies to be discovered back in 1845 by English zoologist Edward Blyth. This subspecies can be differentiated from the others by its larger wingspan, measuring up to 312 mm.

=== Strix nivocolum ma ===
The second subspecies of the Himalayan owl is the Strix nivicolum ma, ranging from Hebei, Jinan and Shandong provinces of China as well of the Korean peninsula. This subspecies can be differentiated by a thin light brown ring around its face as well as a lighter and greyer body than the two others.

=== Strix nivocolum yamadae ===
The last subspecies is the Strix nivicolum yamadae. This subspecies is the most common of the 3 and can be distinguished by its smaller size with a wingspan of only around 256 mm. S. n. yamadae is also different from the two other subspecies due to its yellow nape, black spots, darker face, and paler throat. This subspecies unlike the others is only found in the forests and valleys of Taiwanese mountain ranges.

== Habitat and distribution ==
The Himalayan owl inhabits a widespread territory throughout East Asia and the Himalayas. Its distribution and habitat is quite stationary year round though it have been observed to descend to lower elevations in the winter months. While the Himalayan Owl is divided into three subspecies, all inhabiting different regions of Asia, its habitat is pretty consistent, consisting of coniferous and oak forests as well as rocky ravines in the Himalayan mountains. Although the species is not considered widely at risk, the owls habitat in certain regions, such as South Korea, is increasingly threatened by deforestation and artificial filling of tree cavities. These cavities are preferred breeding sites of the bird and are vital for their reproduction and survival. In areas where tree concentration and cavities are reduced, the Himalayan owl is also known to utilize man-made nest boxes.

== Behaviour ==
=== Vocalizations ===
The Himalayan owl has few distinct vocalizations, a song, a call and specialized calls for mating and communication amongst breeding pairs. Its song consist of two fast hoots: "coo-coo". The sound is described as dove-like, with the second "coo" sometimes lower pitched and slightly longer than the first "coo".

The call of the Himalayan owl can be described as one high pitched "whoo" which is loud and slower than most owl hoots. When mating, Himalayan owls will emit 3 faster hoots, "whoo-whoo-whoo" in order to signal their intent to breed when interacting with another breeding individual. When incubating eggs the owl that remains in the nest will also have a distinct call "kwek, kwek" known as the begging call which is a call for food to the non-incubating individual.

=== Diet ===
The Himalayan owl is nocturnal, sleeping throughout the day and active at night. The owl begins hunting at dusk, perching in trees in its range until it locates its prey within its powerful hearing. Himalayan owls are generalist species eating insects, small birds and small mammals. Their primary prey are rodents, notably shrews and mice such as the Himalayan Field mouse.

=== Reproduction ===
Himalayan owls' population and breeding success are highly dependent on habitat quality and areas that offer cavities in trees or rock crevices. These holes and crevices are where the species nest from late winter through spring. In a suitable habitat, breeding females typically locate a nesting site and remain nearby until approached by a potential mate. After copulation, both the male and female construct the nest in preparation for egg laying, which occurs around one month later. After an average of 3 eggs have been laid, the birds exhibit a slower descent and spread their wings more widely when entering the nest, a change in behaviour thought to prevent damage to the eggs. During incubation, males assist by bringing food to the nesting females and by taking turns with the eggs. The eggs hatch approximately one month after being laid. Both parents share the responsibility of caring for the young, remaining with them almost constantly until around 17 days post-hatching, at which point the parents begin roosting in nearby trees in between feedings. By about 28 days after hatching, the fledglings are able to leave the nest.

== Conservation status ==
Due to the recent taxonomic splits away from the Tawny owl and with the new added subspecies, the current population of the Himalayan owl has not been estimated. The Himalayan owl relies on its habitat quality, which has seen an estimated 8.7% loss of tree cover within the species' range over the past three generations. This reduction suggests that the Himalayan owl population has declined by roughly 1–19% during the same period as a result of habitat degradation. The Himalayan Owl occupies a very large and extensive range. For this reason, despite slow habitat loss, the species does not qualify for a classification as "Vulnerable" on IUCN due to habitat loss criterion (would require an Extent of Occurrence smaller than 20,000 km^{2} combined with evidence fluctuation in range, habitat quality, or population size and/or severe habitat fragmentation). As well, although the bird has very little studies and its total population has not been precisely estimated, it is not thought to be close to the "Vulnerable" threshold under the population size criterion (would require fewer than 10,000 mature individuals undergoing a continuing decline of more than 10% within ten years or over three generations). Finally, despite the overall trend of the species being downward, the rate of decrease is considered too slow to meet the threshold for "Vulnerable" under the population trend criterion (would require a population reduction exceeding 30% over ten years or over three generations). For these reasons, the Himalayan owl and its subspecies are assessed as Least Concern on the IUCN Red List.
