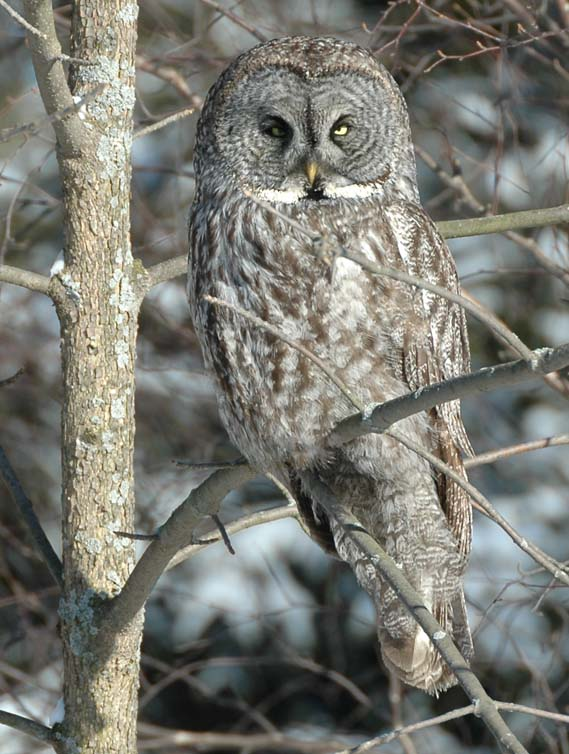
- Great grey owl, Strix nebulosa

Scientific classification
- Kingdom: Animalia
- Phylum: Chordata
- Class: Aves
- Order: Strigiformes
- Family: Strigidae
- Genus: Strix; Linnaeus, 1758

Type species
- Strix stridula = Strix aluco Linnaeus, 1758

Species
- See text.

Synonyms
- Ciccaba Wagler, 1832; Macabra Bonaparte, 1854; Myrtha Bonaparte, 1854; Nyctimene Heine & Reichenow, 1890; Ptynx Blyth, 1840; Stryx Pallas, 1771 (unjustified emendation); Tybo Heine, 1890; Tyto Heine & Reichenow, 1890

= Strix (bird) =

Strix owls Temporal range: Early Miocene to recent

Genus of birds

Strix is a genus of owls in the typical owl family (Strigidae), one of the two generally accepted living families of owls, with the other being Tytonidae. Common names are earless owls or wood owls, though they are not the only owls without ear tufts, and "wood owl" is also used as a more generic name for forest-dwelling owls.

These are medium-sized to large, robustly built, powerful owls. They do not have ear tufts and most are highly nocturnal woodland birds. Most prey on small mammals, birds, and reptiles.

Most owls in the genus Strix can be distinguished from other genera of owls through their hooting vocalization and lack of visible ears.

The Latin genus name Strix referred to a mythical vampiric owl-monster believed to suck the blood of infants. Although the genus Strix was established for the earless owls by Linnaeus in 1758, many applied the term to other owls (namely the Tyto) until the late 19th century. This genus is closely related to the extinct Ornimegalonyx.

== Taxonomy ==
The genus Strix was introduced by the Swedish naturalist Carl Linnaeus in 1758 in the tenth edition of his Systema Naturae. The type species is the tawny owl. The genus name is a Latin word meaning "owl".

Some Neotropical species were formerly classified in a separate genus, Ciccaba, which was eventually merged based on the placement of its type species, Strix huhula.

== Species ==
The genus contains 21 species:

- Spotted wood owl, S. seloputo
- Mottled wood owl, S. ocellata
- Brown wood owl, S. leptogrammica
- Tawny owl, S. aluco – includes the Maghreb owl, S. a. mauritanica
- Himalayan owl, S. nivicolum
- Desert owl, S. hadorami
- Omani owl, S. butleri
- Spotted owl, S. occidentalis
- Barred owl, S. varia
- Cinereous owl, S. sartorii
- Fulvous owl, S. fulvescens
- Rusty-barred owl, S. hylophila
- Chaco owl, S. chacoensis
- Rufous-legged owl, S. rufipes
- Ural owl, S. uralensis
- Great grey owl, S. nebulosa
- African wood owl, S. woodfordii
- Mottled owl, S. virgata
- Black-and-white owl, S. nigrolineata
- Black-banded owl, S. huhula
- Rufous-banded owl, S. albitarsis

=== Fossil species ===
The genus Strix is well represented in the fossil record. Being a fairly generic type of strigid owl, they were probably the first truly modern Strigidae to evolve. However, whether several of the species usually placed in this genus indeed belong here is uncertain.

Generally accepted in Strix are:

- S. dakota (Early Miocene of South Dakota, USA) – tentatively placed here
- Strix sp. (Late Miocene of Nebraska, USA)
- Strix sp. (Late Pliocene of Rębielice Królewski, Poland) apparently similar to the great grey owl
- Strix intermedia (Early - Middle Pleistocene of EC Europe) – may be paleosubspecies of S. aluco
- Strix brea (Late Pleistocene of SW North America) Now placed in its own genus. (See below)
- Strix sp. (Late Pleistocene of Ladds, USA)

"Strix" wintershofensis (Early/Middle Miocene of Wintershof West, Germany) and "Strix" edwardsi (Middle Miocene of Grive-Saint-Alban, France), while being strigid owls, have not at present been reliably identified to genus; they might also belong into the European Ninox-like group.

"Strix" ignota (Middle Miocene of Sansan, France) is sometimes erroneously considered a nomen nudum, but this assumption is based on what appears to be a lapsus or misprint in a 1912 source. It may well belong into the present genus, but this requires confirmation.

"Strix" perpasta (Late Miocene – Early Pliocene of Gargano Peninsula, Italy) does not appear to belong into this genus either. It is sometimes considered a junior synonym of a brown fish-owl paleosubspecies.

UMMP V31030, a coracoid from Late Pliocene Rexroad Formation deposits of Kansas (USA), cannot be conclusively assigned to either the present genus or Bubo.

Extinct forms formerly in Strix:

- "Strix" antiqua – now in Prosybris
- "Strix" brea - now Oraristrix brea
- "Strix" brevis – now in Intutula
- "Strix" collongensis – now in Alasio
- "Strix" melitensis and "Strix" sanctialbani – now in Tyto
- "Strix" murivora – male of the Rodrigues scops owl
- "Strix" newtoni and "Strix" sauzieri – male and female of the Mauritius scops owl
