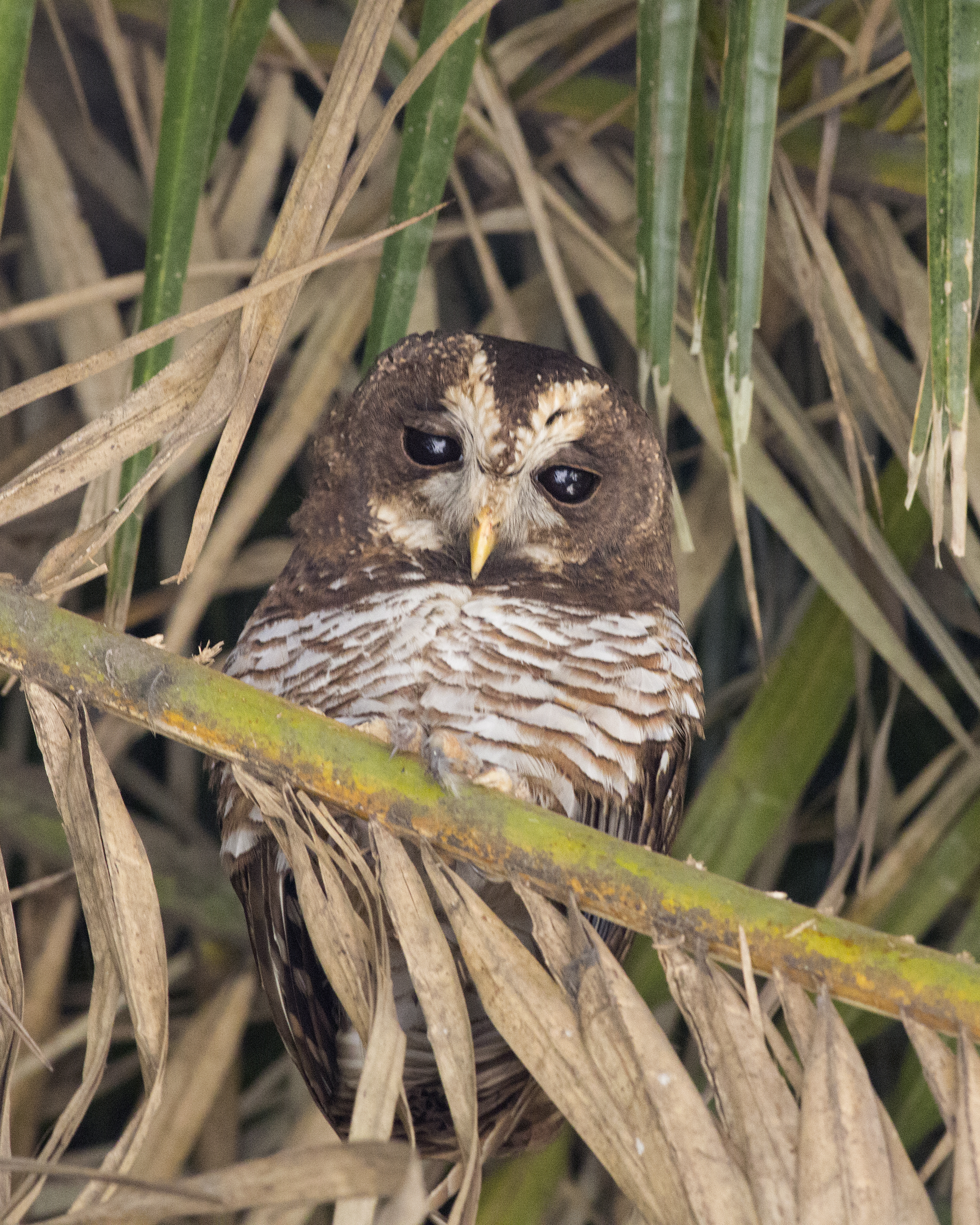

Conservation status
- Least Concern (IUCN 3.1)
- CITES Appendix II

Scientific classification
- Kingdom: Animalia
- Phylum: Chordata
- Class: Aves
- Order: Strigiformes
- Family: Strigidae
- Genus: Strix
- Species: S. woodfordii

Binomial name
- Strix woodfordii (Smith, A, 1834)

Synonyms
- Ciccaba woodfordii Smith A., 1834

= African wood owl =

Species of owl

The African wood owl (Strix woodfordii) or Woodford's owl, is a typical owl from the genus Strix in the family Strigidae and is arguably the most common forest owl in Africa. It inhabits wooded areas and possesses a distinctive call. During the day it roosts singly or in pairs in dense cover, high in trees, whilst at night it forages for food.

== Description ==
The African wood owl is a medium-sized owl which has the typical rounded head of the genus Strix, similar to the Palearctic tawny owl or Holarctic great grey owl, with large dark eyes outlined by white eyebrows. The rest of the head is generally dark brown with white spots and a prominent yellow beak. It has a white belly with brown barring and has and overall rich brown plumage with paler underparts, but this varies considerably across its range. Juveniles are a paler rufous colour. It is 30.5 to 35 cm (12.0 to 13.8 in) long and weighs from 240 to 350 grams (8.5 to 12.3 oz).

=== Voice ===
The typical song, like that of the tawny owl, is a duet between the male and the female, the male makes a series of rapid, clear hoots, and the female answers with higher pitched, more leisurely hoots. Each series of hoots (for each sex) comprise three groups of syllables (WHU-hu, WHU-hu-hu, hu-hu). Calling begins after dusk.

The call is audible over 500 m away and has a maximum frequency of 1kHz. There is evidence that individuals can be differentiated based on their calls. Other sounds made by African wood owls include a howl (which is monosyllabic) and bill clicking which can be heard at the nest or when the owl is alarmed.

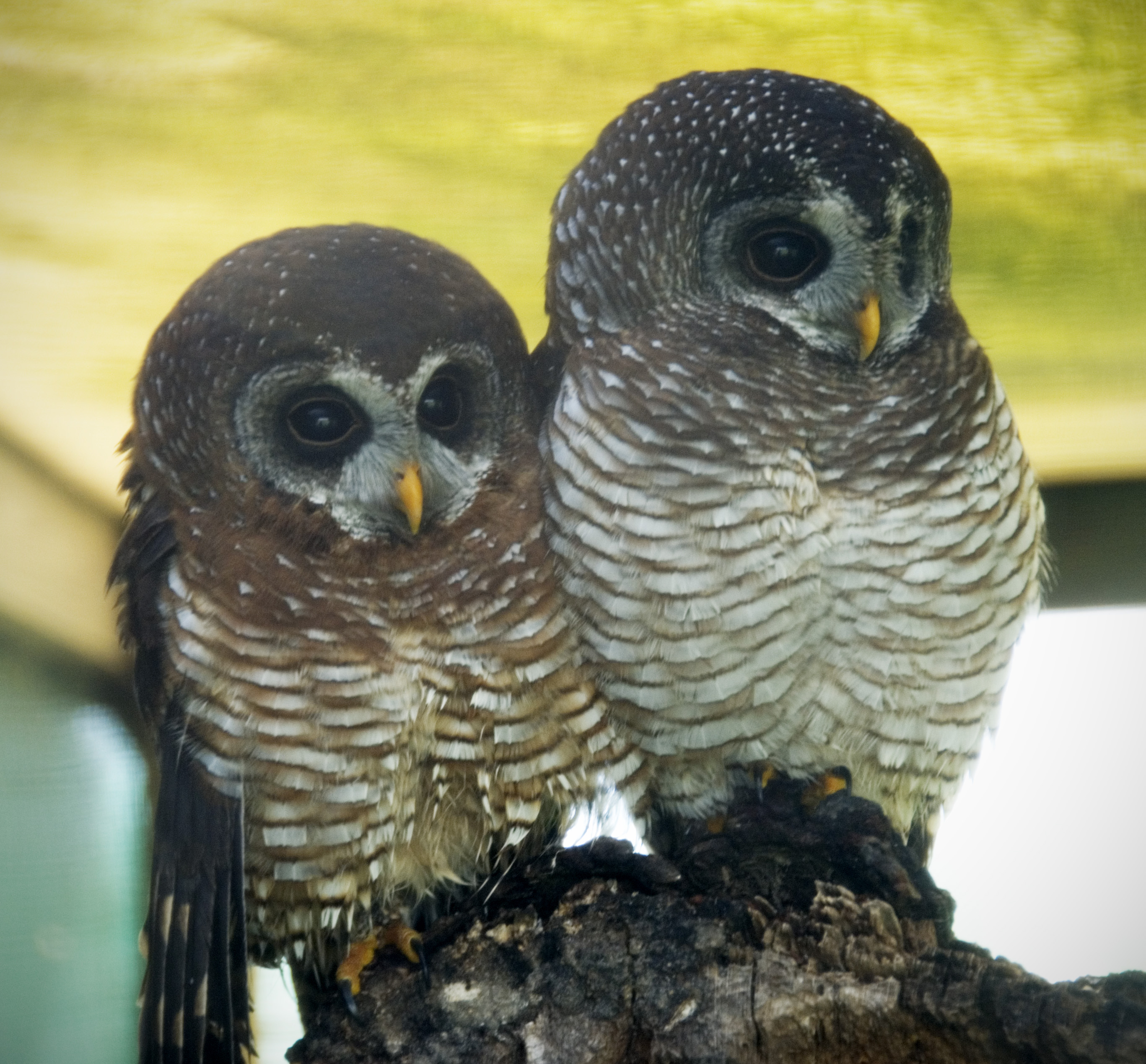
A pair of African wood owls.

== Distribution ==
African wood owls can be found throughout much of sub-Saharan Africa. They are found from Senegal and The Gambia, along the Gulf of Guinea into the Congo Basin and Angola. In the east they occur from Ethiopia down through Kenya and Tanzania into Zambia and Mozambique. Although absent from most of Namibia, they do occur in the Caprivi region, as well as Botswana, Zimbabwe, Eswatini and South Africa as far south as Cape Town.

== Habitat and Diet ==
African wood owls live in indigenous forests and woodlands of sub-Saharan Africa (occasionally found in plantations). In Southern Africa they inhabit riparian, coastal and escarpment forests. They can also be found in well wooded suburban areas.

African wood owls are strictly nocturnal and eat mostly insects, but will also eat reptiles, small mammals, and other birds which are mostly caught by swooping from a perch.

== Nesting ==
It breeds from July to October and lays 1 to 3 eggs in a tree hollow (although there have been odd instances of nests on the ground). Incubation starts with the first egg so that the young hatch asynchronously and if there is a food shortage then siblicide occurs. The eggs are incubated for about 31 days. Five weeks after the eggs hatch, the young will leave the nest and are able to fly two weeks later. The young will remain with the parents for about four months, occasionally even staying until the next breeding season.

== predators ==
Daytime canopy roosting makes African wood owls vulnerable to capture by wild chimpanzees (Pan troglodytes), which adult owls actively mob to defend their chicks. Observations in Bossou, Guinea, recorded chimpanzees capturing, plucking, and playing with wood owls without consuming them.

== Taxonomy and naming ==
This owl and a number of Neotropical owls were placed in the genus Ciccaba but as they are doubtless closely related to Strix they are now treated as such. Of the 22 species currently recognized within the Strix clade, it is most closely related to the Omani Owl (Strix butleri), its sister species.

This owl is named after the British soldier of the Napoleonic Wars and naturalist Colonel E.J.A. Woodford.

There are currently four recognised subspecies, each with their own distribution:

- Strix woodfordii woodfordii: southern Angola and southern Democratic Republic of the Congo, north to southwestern Tanzania, east to Botswana and South Africa.
- Strix woodfordii nuchalis: Senegal and Gambia east to South Sudan, Uganda, the western Democratic Republic of the Congo, and northern Angola, also Bioko.
- Strix woodfordii umbrina: Ethiopia and eastern South Sudan
- Strix woodfordii nigricantior: southern Somalia to Kenya south to Tanzania including Zanzibar, and eastern Democratic Republic of the Congo.
