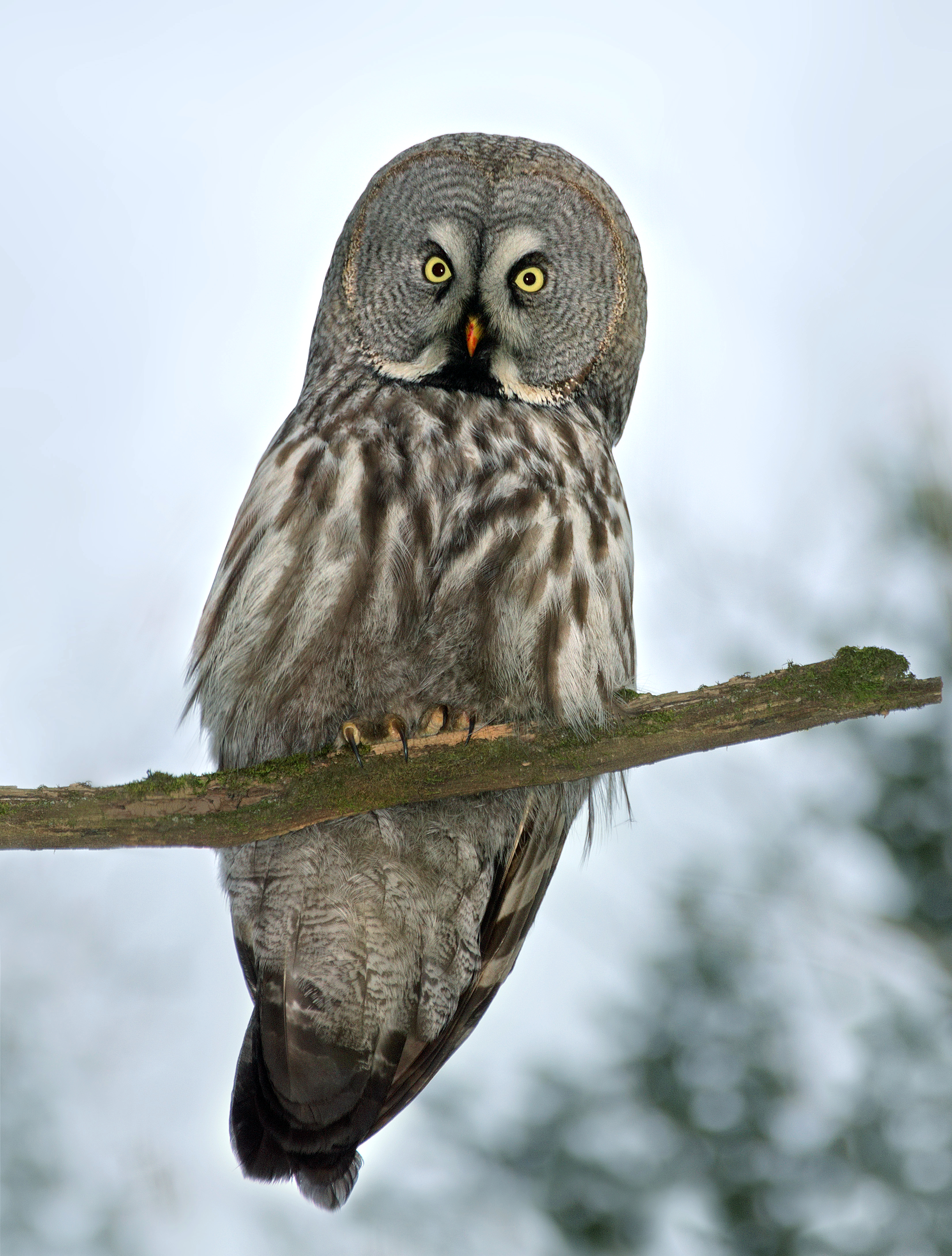
- Strix nebulosa lapponica

Conservation status
- Least Concern (IUCN 3.1)
- CITES Appendix II

Scientific classification
- Kingdom: Animalia
- Phylum: Chordata
- Class: Aves
- Order: Strigiformes
- Family: Strigidae
- Genus: Strix
- Species: S. nebulosa

Binomial name
- Strix nebulosa Forster, 1772

= Great grey owl =

Species of owl

The great grey owl (Strix nebulosa) (also great gray owl in American English) is a true owl, and is the world's largest species of owl by length. It is distributed across the Northern Hemisphere and is the only species in the genus Strix found in both Eastern and Western Hemispheres.

== Description ==
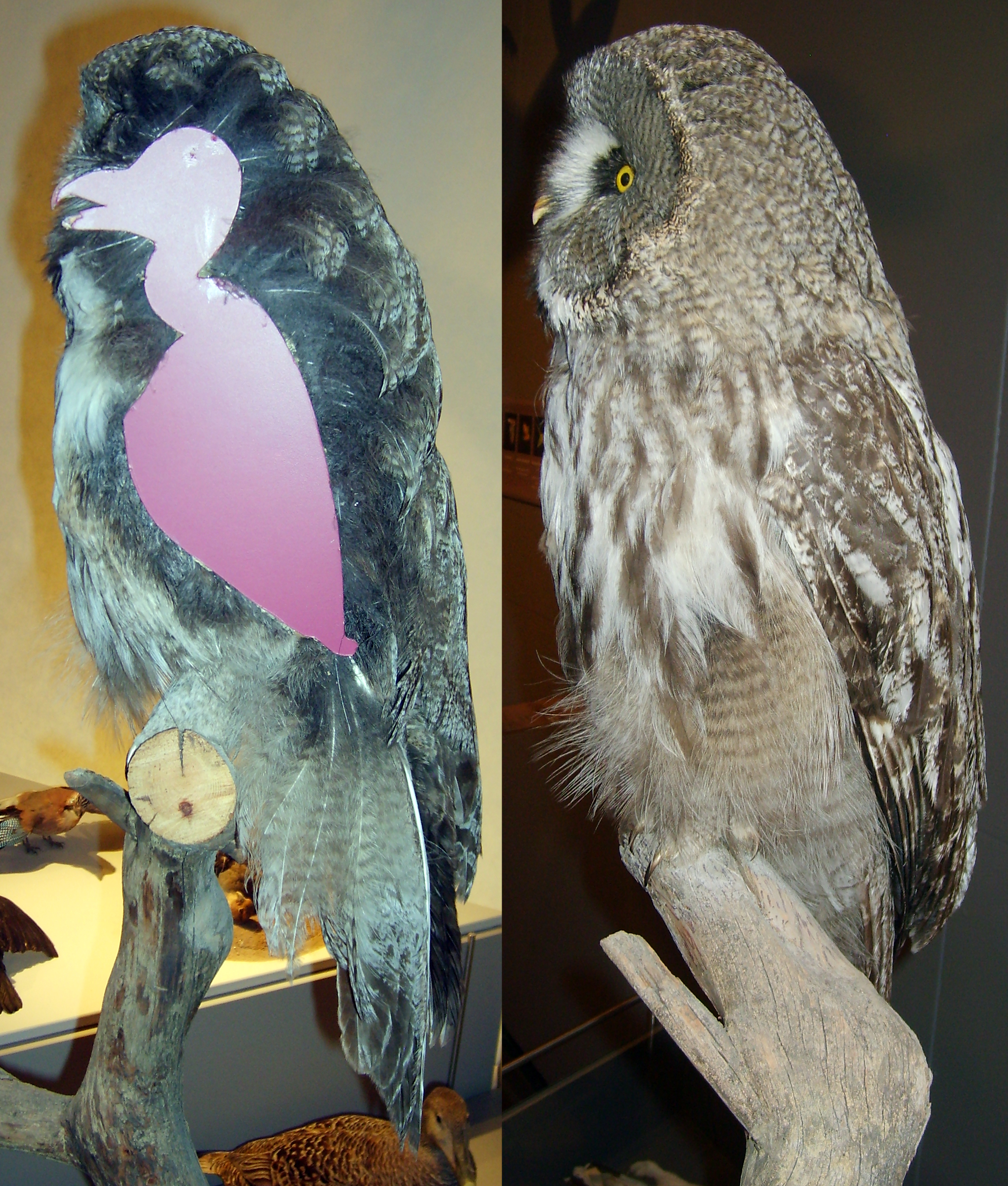
Cross-sectioned great grey owl specimen showing the extent of the body plumage, Copenhagen Zoological Museum

Adults have large, rounded heads with grey faces and yellow eyes with darker circles around them. The underparts are light with dark streaks; the upper parts are grey with pale bars. This owl does not have ear tufts and has the largest facial disc of any raptor. A white collar or "bow-tie" is just below the beak. The long tail tapers to a rounded end.

In length, the great grey owl is believed to exceed the Eurasian eagle-owl and Blakiston's fish owl as the world's largest owl. The great grey is outweighed by those two species and several others, including most of the genus Bubo. Much of its size is deceptive, since this species' fluffy feathers, large head, and the longest tail of any extant owl obscure a body lighter than that of most other large owls. The length ranges from 61 to 84 cm (24 to 33 in), averaging 72 cm (28 in) for females and 67 cm (26 in) for males. The wingspan can exceed 152 cm (5 ft 0 in), but averages 142 cm (4 ft 8 in) for females and 140 cm (4 ft 7 in) for males. The adult weight ranges from 580 to 1,900 g (1.28 to 4.19 lb), averaging 1,290 g (2.84 lb) for females and 1,000 g (2.2 lb) for males. The males are usually smaller than females, as with most owl species.

The call of the adult is a series of very deep, rhythmic 'who's, which is usually given in correlation to their territories or in interactions with their offspring. At other times, adults are normally silent. The young may chatter, shriek, or hiss. Tame owls may produce higher-pitched hoots when given food by humans.

== Taxonomy ==
The two recognized subspecies of the great grey owl are spread across North America and Eurasia.

- S. n. nebulosa (Forster, 1772): North America from central Alaska eastward across Canada to southwestern Quebec, and south to northern California, northern Idaho, western Montana, Wyoming, and northeastern Minnesota.
- S. n. lapponica (Thunberg, 1798): Northern Eurasia, from Fennoscandia through Siberia to Sakhalin and Kamchatka Krai to Lithuania, Lake Baikal, Kazakhstan, Mongolia, Manchuria, and northeastern China.

== Habitat ==
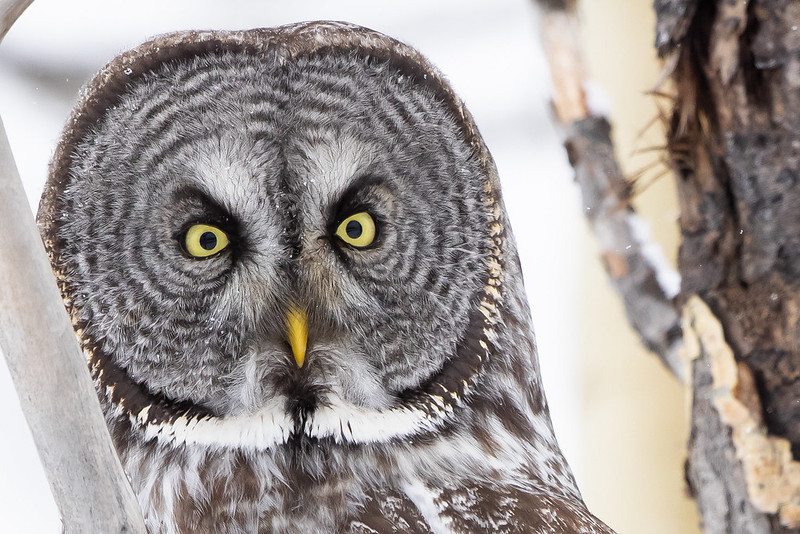
Detail of the head, Kenai National Wildlife Refuge, Alaska

In northern areas, their breeding habitat is often the dense coniferous forests of the taiga, near open areas, such as meadows or bogs. In Oregon and California, this owl has been found nesting in mixed oak woodlands. Once believed to require a cold climate, this bird is now known to survive in a few areas where summer temperatures exceed 100 °F (38 °C).

== Lifespan ==
In the wild, great grey owls have been recorded to live between 10 and 20 years with the average being seven. However, they tend to live longer in captivity, reaching about 27 years. National Geographic recorded at least one as having lived to the age of 40, and the oldest recorded wild owl was around 19 years.

== Range ==
They breed in North America from as far east as Quebec to the Pacific coast and Alaska, and from Finland and Estonia across northern Asia. They are permanent residents, although northerly populations may move south and southeast when food is scarce. In Europe, they are found breeding in Norway and Sweden and more numerously through Finland and Russia. Though the species occurs in Europe, the first great grey owl recognized by science was found in Canada in the late 18th century.

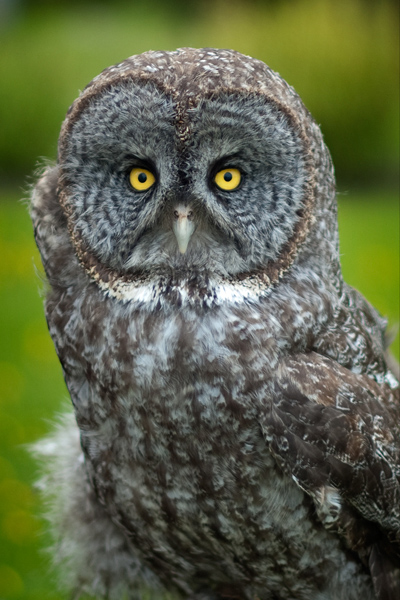
Adult female

Sedentary populations exist in the Pacific states of California, Oregon, and Washington. The great grey owl in this region is found in disjunct areas of appropriate habitat. In winter, these birds do not move far, but may go downslope to escape deep snow, as they must capture their prey on the ground.

In Oregon, the great grey owl breeding range is scattered from the Siskiyou Mountains in the southwest to the Blue Mountains in the northeast. Two bird festivals each May feature field trips to try to see the species: The Ladd Marsh Festival in La Grande and the Mountain Bird Festival in Ashland.

A 2015 study in California estimated fewer than 300 birds were in the state at the time. The species is listed as endangered under the California Endangered Species Act. The California range for the species includes a small extension of the Oregon population, north of Alturas. In addition, breeding has been confirmed in the Tahoe National Forest east of Nevada City, in the Sierra Nevada foothills south of I-80 around 2,000 feet (610 m) elevation, and for the population clustered around Yosemite. Yosemite is where the first nest south of Canada was found in 1914. A study of the Yosemite owls shows that this population has been genetically isolated from populations in Oregon and farther north for more than 25,000 years. Biologists working on that study suggest that the Yosemite population should be considered a separate subspecies (S. n. yosemitensis). Nearby populations at lower elevations were not tested.

In Washington, great grey owls are found in the southeast where mountains extend north from Oregon and in the Colville National Forest. Only a handful of great grey owl nests have ever been found in Washington.

Farther east in the Western United States, great grey owls breed in Idaho, Montana, and Wyoming, as far south as the Grand Teton and Yellowstone National Parks.

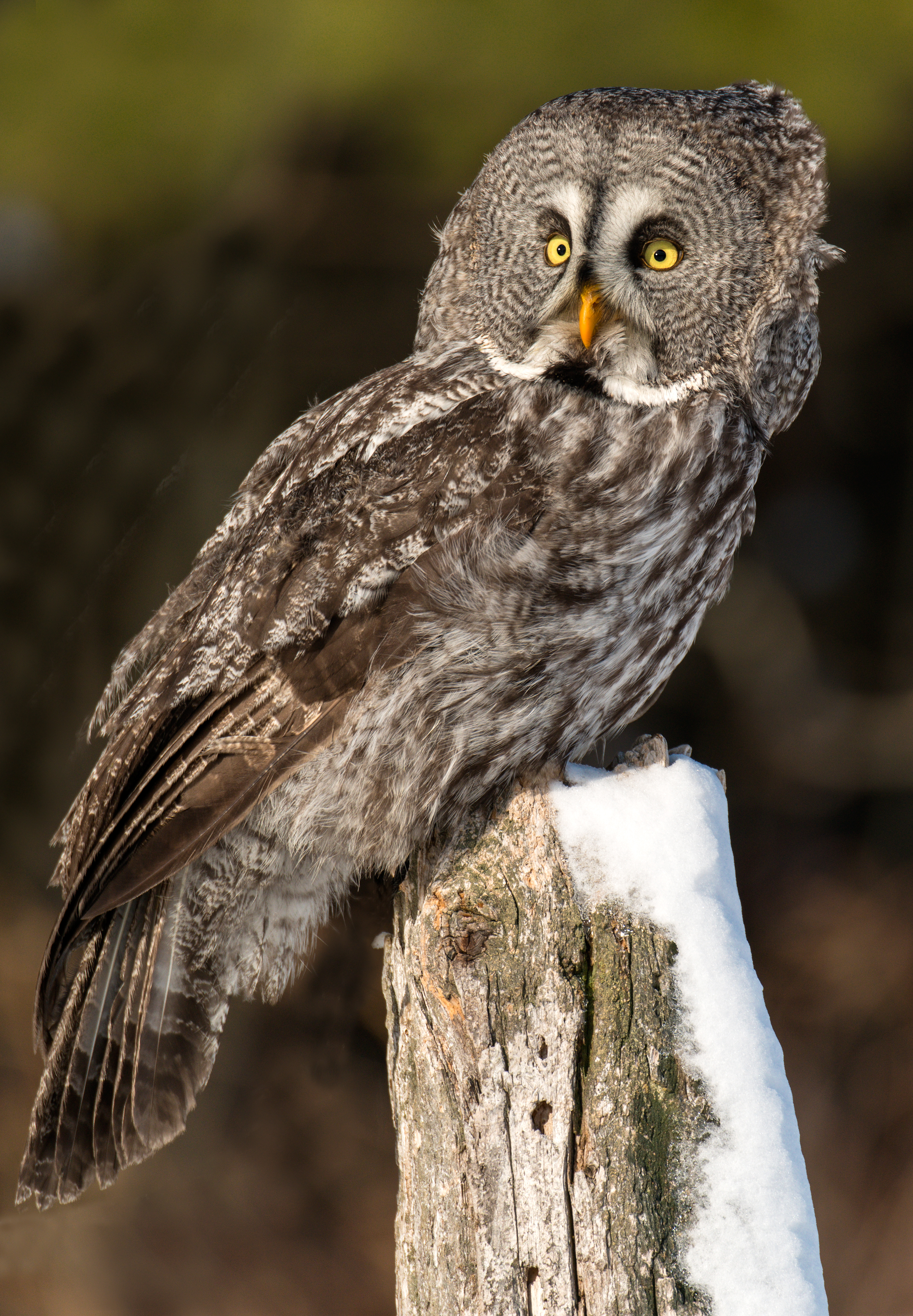
Adult male great grey owl (Canada)

In northeastern North America, the owls are found year-round in southern Quebec and Ontario, but individuals sometimes move further south in winter into New York and New England, apparently in pursuit of more abundant prey. Great grey owls are rarely sighted as far south as Pennsylvania and Long Island, New York. In winter 2017, the birds were recorded in northern New York in Robert Moses State Park and central Maine. Although rare, sightings have also occurred in Iowa, Wisconsin, North Dakota, South Dakota, and Utah.

== Breeding ==
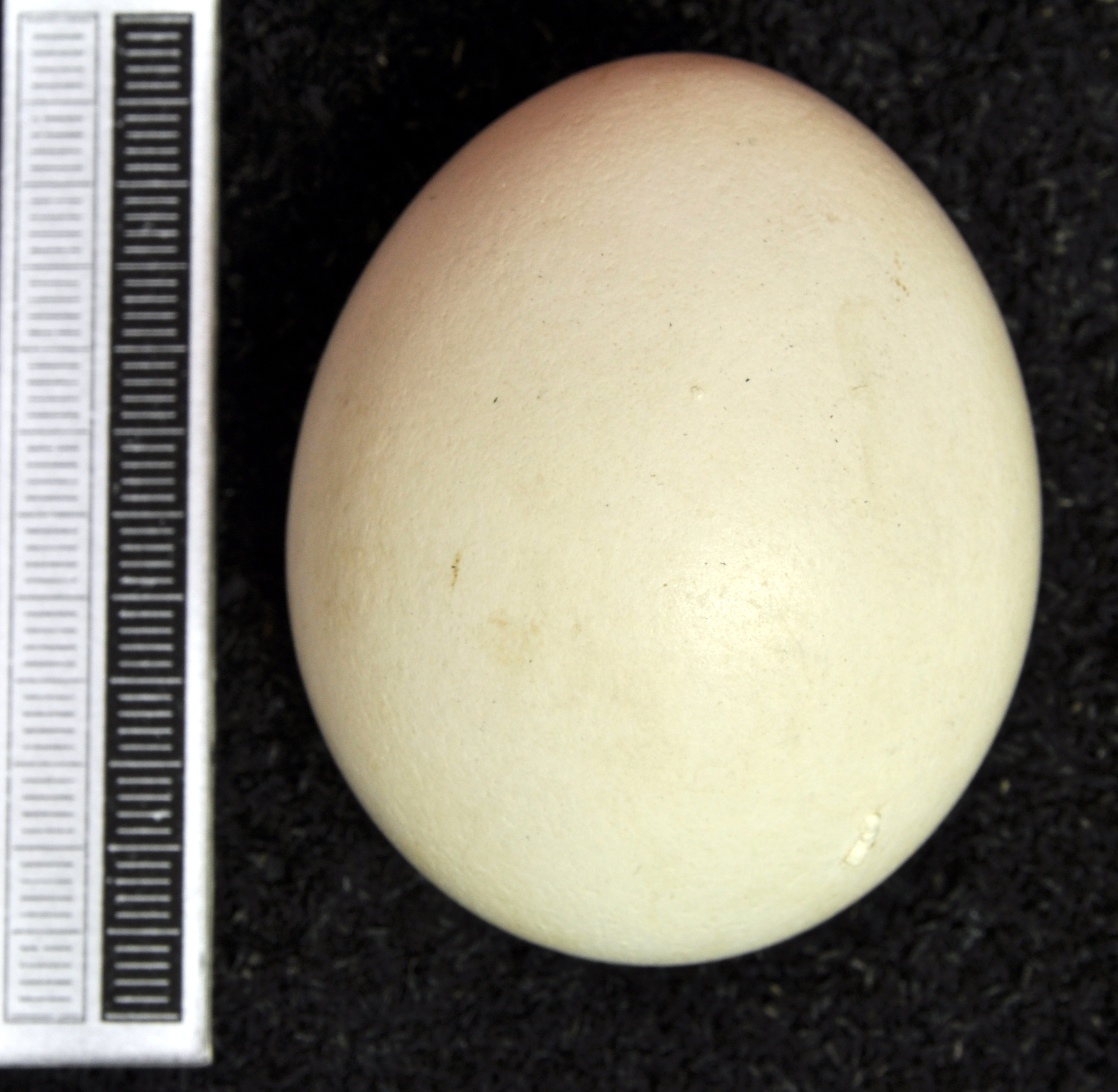
Egg, Collection Museum Wiesbaden

Great grey owls do not build nests, so they typically use nests previously used by a large bird, such as a raptor. They also nest in broken-topped trees and cavities in large trees. In southwestern and northeastern Oregon, the great grey owl has been using man-made platforms for nest sites since the 1980s. The erection of nest platforms for them was pioneered by Robert Nero in central Canada in the 1970s. Nesting may occur from March to May. Unlike, for example, osprey or white storks, the great grey owl does not predictably reuse nest sites over consecutive years. Clutches contain between 2-5 eggs. Eggs average 42.7 mm (1.68 in) wide and 53.5 mm (2.11 in) long. The incubation period is about 30 days, ranging from 28 to 36 days. Brooding lasts 2 to 3 weeks, after which the female starts roosting on a tree near nests. The young jump or fall from the nest at 3 to 4 weeks, and start to fly 1 to 2 weeks after this. Immediately after fledging, the white, fuzzy young must use beak and feet to climb back into trees. The female is on guard at this time and may be aggressive toward potential predators. Most offspring remain near their natal sites for many months after fledging. Normally, the male hunts for his mate and the young throughout the nesting period. Once the young begin to fly, the female typically withdraws and the male continues to feed the young until they can hunt on their own in the autumn. The young owls go off on their own by winter.

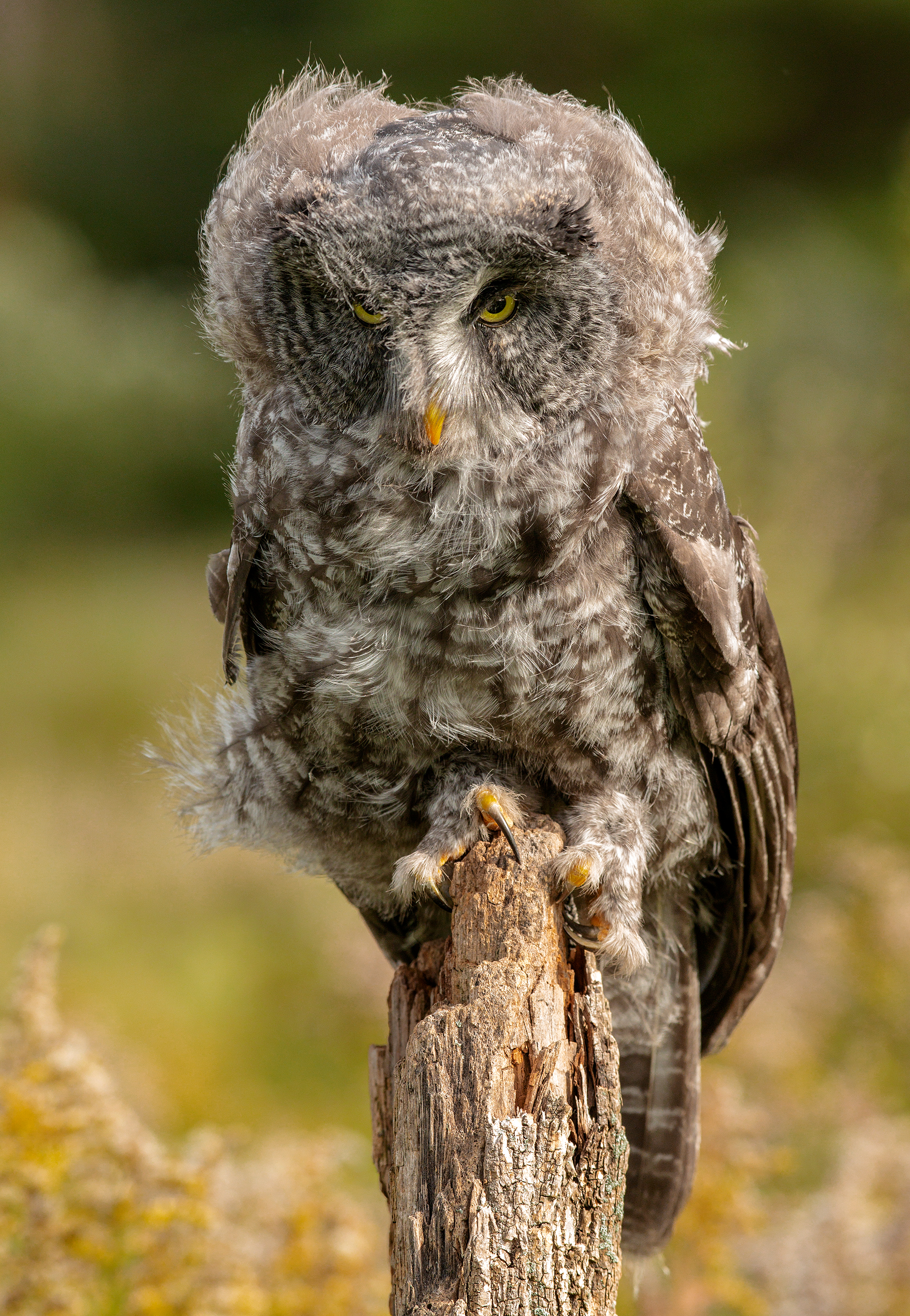
Windblown juvenile great grey owl

The abundance of food in the area usually affects the number of eggs a female lays, a feature quite common in northern owl species. In years when small mammal populations are very low, the great grey owl may not attempt nesting; thus, their reproduction is connected to the sometimes-extreme fluctuations of small mammal populations. Also, great grey owls may not nest in years of drought. If food is scarce, they may travel a fair distance to find more prey, with considerable movements by large numbers in some years of particularly scarce prey. Though they do not migrate, many are at least somewhat nomadic.

== Feeding ==
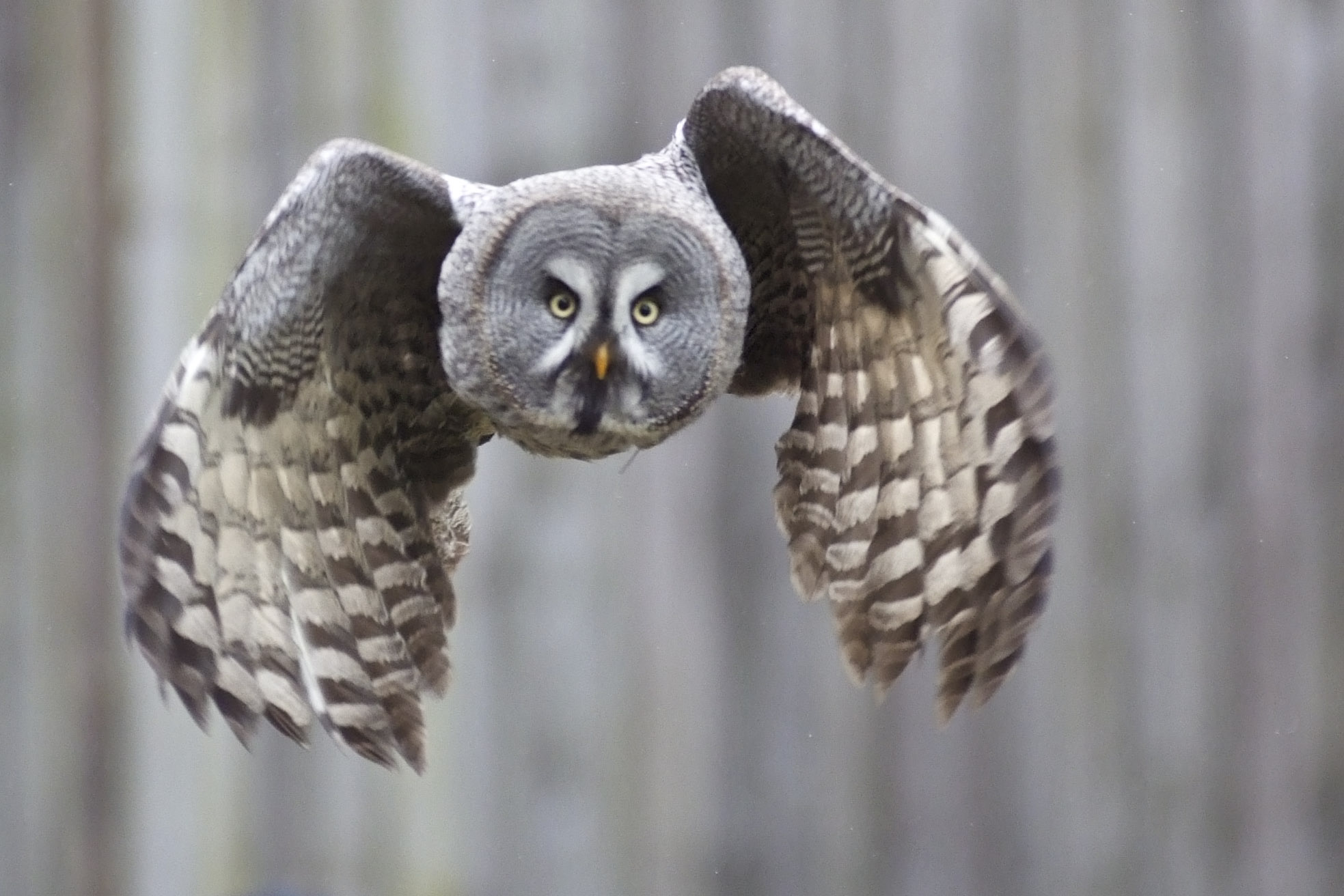
Owl in flight

These birds wait, listen, and watch for prey, then swoop down; they also may fly low through open areas in search of prey. They frequently hunt from a low listening post, which can be a stump, low tree limb, fence post, or road sign. Their large facial discs, also known as "ruffs", focus sound, and the asymmetrical placement of their ears assists them in locating prey, because of the lack of light during the late and early hours in which they hunt. On the nesting grounds, they mainly hunt at night and near dawn and dusk; at other times, they are active mostly during the night.

They have excellent hearing, and may locate (and then capture) prey moving beneath 60 cm (2.0 ft) of snow in a series of tunnels solely with that sense. They then can crash to a snow depth roughly equal to their own body size to grab their prey. Only this species, and more infrequently, other fairly large owls from the genus Strix are known to "snow-plunge" for prey, a habit that is thought to require superb hearing not possessed by all types of owls.

Unlike the more versatile eagle and horned owls, great grey owls rely almost fully upon small rodents. What species they eat depends on which small mammals are most abundant and available. In northern Canada and other parts of Scandinavia, they eat lemmings primarily. In dry parts of California's Sierra Nevada, they eat mostly pocket gophers. In some areas, voles are the predominant prey. Locally, alternative prey animals (usually comprising less than 20% of prey intake) include squirrels, hares, moles, shrews, weasels, thrushes, grouse, Canada jays, mountain quail, small hawks, ducks, frogs, and large beetles. This species is not known to scavenge or steal from other predators. In mated pairs, the male is the primary hunter that provides food for the entire family while the female guards and broods the eggs, nestlings, and flightless fledglings.

== Threats ==
The harvest of timber from the great grey owl's habitat is, perhaps, the greatest threat to this species. Intensified timber management typically reduces live and dead large-diameter trees used for nesting, leaning trees used by juveniles for roosting before they can fly, and dense canopy closures in stands used by juveniles for cover and protection. If perches are not left in clearcuts, great grey owls cannot readily hunt in them. Although human-made structures (made specifically for use by this species) have been used by these owls, the species is far more common in areas protected from logging. Livestock grazing in meadows also adversely affects great grey owls, by reducing habitat for preferred prey species.

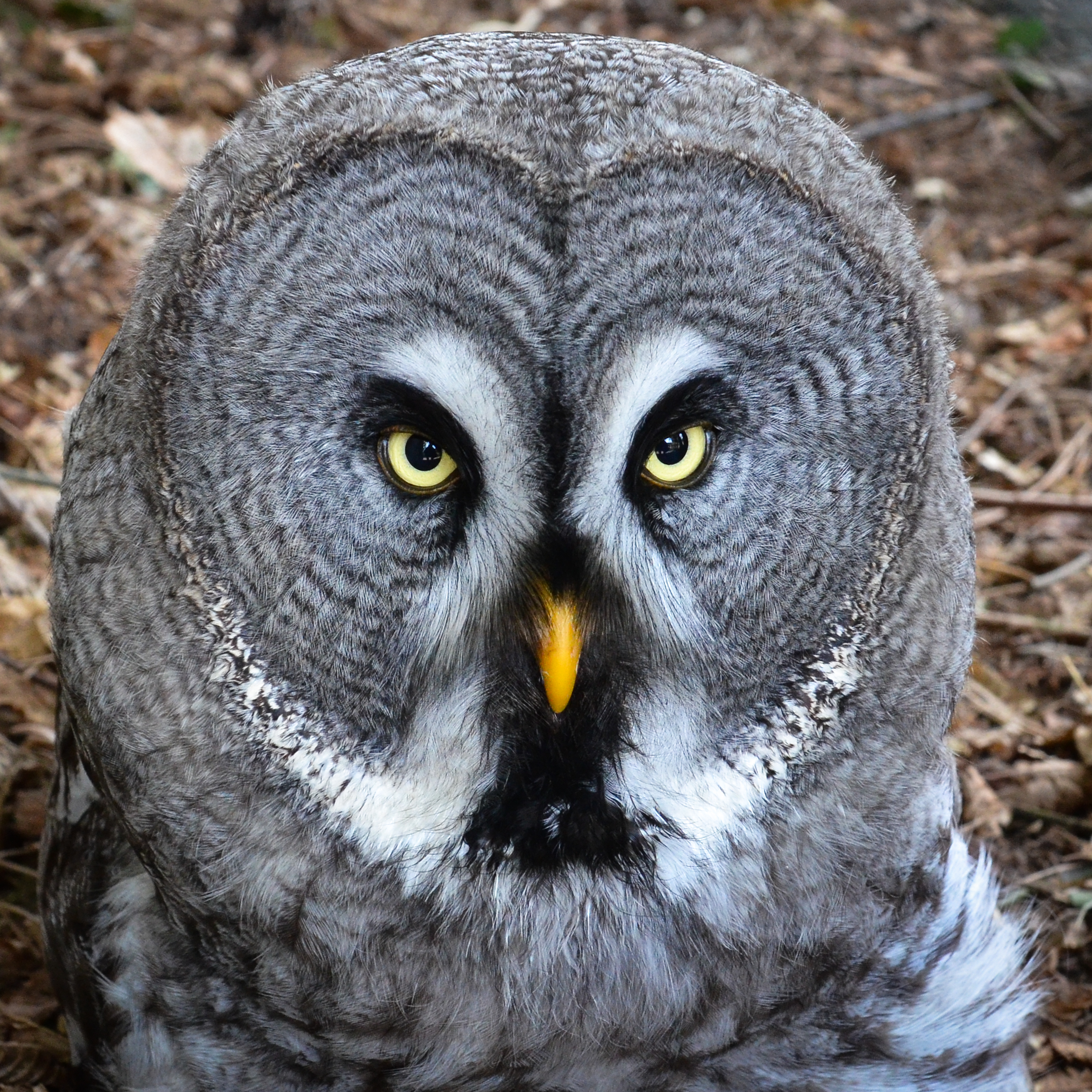
Plumage of the face (Weltvogelpark Walsrode)

Other dangers to great grey owls include rodenticides, collisions with vehicles, and the West Nile virus, which is likely to become more prevalent with climate change. In Ontario and northeastern Oregon, great grey owl deaths from the virus have been confirmed. Testing of owls in the Yosemite area since 2005 has found evidence of the virus in that population.

Their large size protects great grey owls from natural predators. Great horned owls, various small carnivores, and black bears have been documented preying on young, but such predators rarely threaten adults, and owls have been known to fend off animals as large as black bears when defending their nests. The only known predator of adult great grey owls is the Eurasian eagle-owl (Bubo bubo), which occasionally preys on the former in parts of Europe.

== Territorial behavior ==
Great grey owls are not as aggressive as most other apex predators. They are less likely to attack each other or potential threats than are other large predatory birds. They do not protect a large nesting territory, nor do they defend hunting territories through aggression. As an exception, the females are aggressive in protecting eggs and owlets and are especially alert and aggressive when fledglings first leave the nest but cannot yet fly so are extremely vulnerable.

This lack of territorial aggressiveness makes the great grey owl difficult to find in the field. Most owls respond to their own species calls if played back in a nesting territory. Great grey owls often ignore such calls. They also do not flush every time a human approaches or drives past. The great grey owl often remains still even if a human is nearby, so they are often overlooked or unnoticed.

== Provincial bird ==
The great grey owl is the provincial bird of Manitoba, Canada.

== Captivity ==
As of 2016, four great grey owls are in captivity in Oregon and California. Two live at Blue Mountain Wildlife near Pendleton, Oregon, a third lives at Lindsay Museum in Walnut Creek, California, and the fourth lives at CuriOdyssey in San Mateo, California.

A captive, wild, injured great grey owl, Boris, resides at the Alaska Raptor Center in Sitka, Alaska. Boris was found north of Anchorage with a trauma to his right wrist, leaving him flightless.

Another captive, wild, injured great grey owl, Errol, lives at the Alaska Zoo in Anchorage. Errol came to the zoo from Wild Bird Rescue after injuring himself while colliding with the tire of a parked car.

The Eurasian subspecies of the grey owl is very commonly kept in European zoos.

== In art ==
A great grey owl with human hands is depicted on William Schaff's album art for The Magnolia Electric Co., a 2003 alt-country album by Songs: Ohia.
