= Ear tuft =

Feathery projections on bird's head

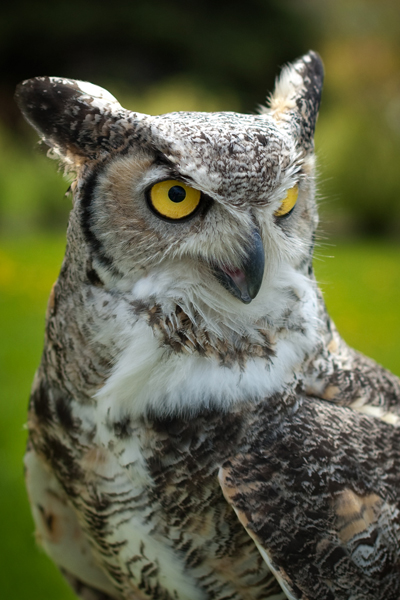
The great horned owl is named for its distinctive tufts of feathers.

Ear tufts are a collection of fur or feathers found on animals which can resemble an animal's ear or is near the animal's ear.

== Cats ==
Ear tufts are not found on all cat breeds. The ear tufts are located on the tips of cat ears and are also known as lynx tipping. Cat ear tufts are often confused with cat ear furnishings which is the fur that comes out of the opening of the ear. Cat ear tufts assist with keeping debris out of the ear and guides sound into the ear canal.

== Red Squirrels ==
The red squirrel has a darker winter coat with noticeably larger ear-tufts (a prominent distinguishing feature of this species) between August and November.

== Birds ==
Bird ear tufts are skin projections covered in feathers found in some bird species, most notably various species of owl, vaguely resembling mammalian ears, but unrelated to the animal's hearing. Theories about their function range from improved ability to camouflage, aiding in finding a suitable mate, to giving a more threatening appearance to discourage predators.

=== In Araucana chicken ===
In the Araucana breed of chickens, ear tufts are a mutation. It causes a skin projection covered in feathers to appear on the sides of the head near the ears. This mutation is dominant semi-lethal. Consequently, ear tufts are very unusual and difficult to breed, as most Araucanas are hatched without tufts.

=== Lethal gene ===
Ear tufts in the Araucana breed of chicken are associated with a lethal gene: An ear tufted hen mated with an ear tufted cock produce chicks with deformed ears and mouth that die before hatching. Also, the rumplessness of the breed makes breeding Araucanas together have very short backs. In any other chicken breed, ear tufts are undesirable.
