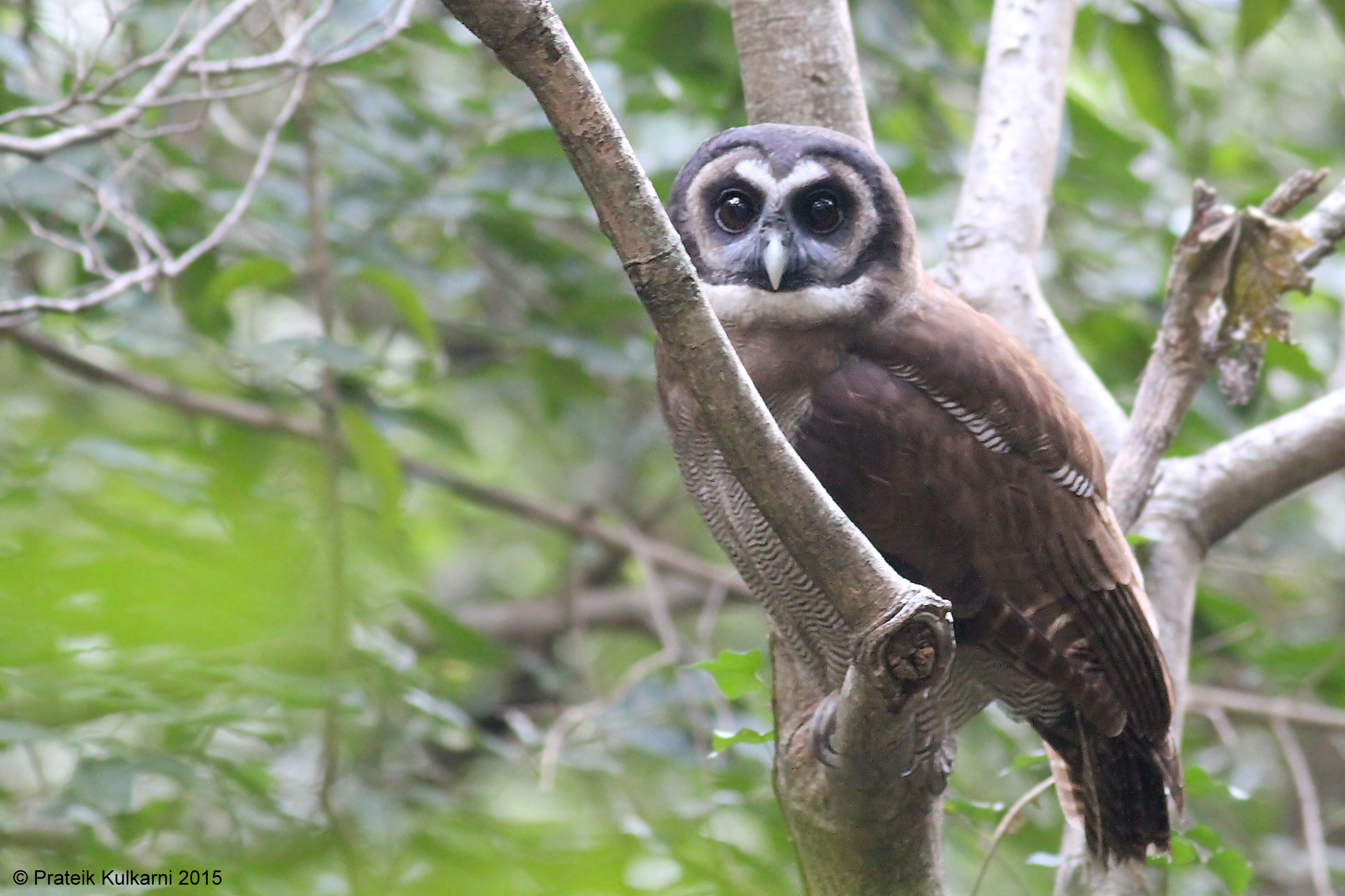
- Sattal, Uttarakhand

Conservation status
- Least Concern (IUCN 3.1)
- CITES Appendix II

Scientific classification
- Kingdom: Animalia
- Phylum: Chordata
- Class: Aves
- Order: Strigiformes
- Family: Strigidae
- Genus: Strix
- Species: S. leptogrammica

Binomial name
- Strix leptogrammica Temminck, 1832

Audio
- Call of S. l. indranee

= Brown wood owl =

Species of owl

The brown wood owl (Strix leptogrammica) is found in India, Bangladesh, Sri Lanka, Indonesia, Taiwan, and south China. The brown wood owl is a resident breeder in south Asia. This species is a part of the family of owls known as typical owls (Strigidae), which contains most species of owl. It belongs to the earless owl genus Strix.

The brown wood owl is medium large (45–57 cm), with upperparts uniformly dark brown, with faint white spotting on the shoulders. The underparts are buff with brown streaking. The facial disc is brown or rufous, edged with white and without concentric barring, and the eyes are dark brown. There is a white neckband. The sexes are similar in appearance.

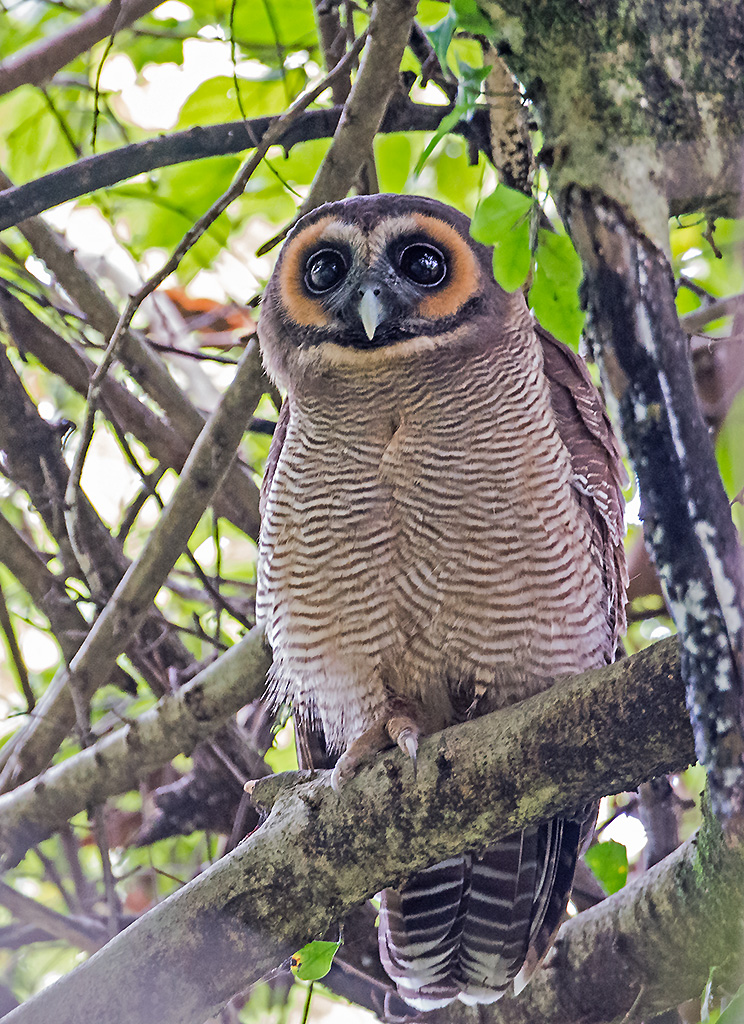
S. l. ochrogenis at Welimada, Sri Lanka

Their call is a (hoo) hoo hoo HOO, or a deep goke-goke-ga-LOOO, or a loud scream. Their alarm call is a bark, wow-wow. Some subspecies are known to produce distinct vocalizations; they are also different in appearance and parapatric, and might be distinct species: The northern Strix (leptogrammica) newarensis group (Himalayan wood-owl; present subspecies newarensis, ticehursti, laotiana and caligata) which occur from the Himalayan foothills of Kashmir east to Taiwan have a soft low to-hooh not unlike a rock dove cooing. S. (l.) bartelsi (Bartels's wood-owl), Javan wood-owl from Java, the southeasternmost taxon, has a loud, forceful, single HOOH! with long pauses between calls.

This species is highly nocturnal and is commonly found in dense forests. It can often be located by the small birds that mob it while it is roosting in a tree. The diet of the brown wood owl consists mainly of small mammals, birds, and reptiles.

== Subspecies ==
There are 14 subspecies.

- S. leptogrammica bartelsi - Bartel's wood-owl or Javan brown wood owl
- S. leptogrammica caligata - Formosan brown wood owl
- S. leptogrammica chaseni
- S. leptogrammica indranee
- S. leptogrammica laotiana
- S. leptogrammica leptogrammica
- S. leptogrammica maingayi
- S. leptogrammica myrtha
- S. leptogrammica newarensis - Himalayan wood-owl
- S. leptogrammica niasensis
- S. leptogrammica nyctiphasma
- S. leptogrammica ochrogenys - Sri Lankan wood owl
- S. leptogrammica ticehursti
- S. leptogrammica vaga

== Bibliography ==
- Grimmett, Richard; Inskipp, Carol, Inskipp, Tim & Byers, Clive (1999): Birds of India, Pakistan, Nepal, Bangladesh, Bhutan, Sri Lanka, and the Maldives. Princeton University Press, Princeton, N.J.. ISBN 0-691-04910-6
- Holt, Denver W., Berkley, Regan; Deppe, Caroline; Enríquez Rocha, Paula L.; Olsen, Penny D.; Petersen, Julie L.; Rangel Salazar, José Luis; Segars, Kelley P. & Wood, Kristin L. (1999): 96. Brown Wood Owl. In: del Hoyo, J.; Elliott, A. & Sargatal, J. (eds): Handbook of Birds of the World, Volume 5: Barn-owls to Hummingbirds: 197–198, plate 12. Lynx Edicions, Barcelona. ISBN 84-87334-25-3
