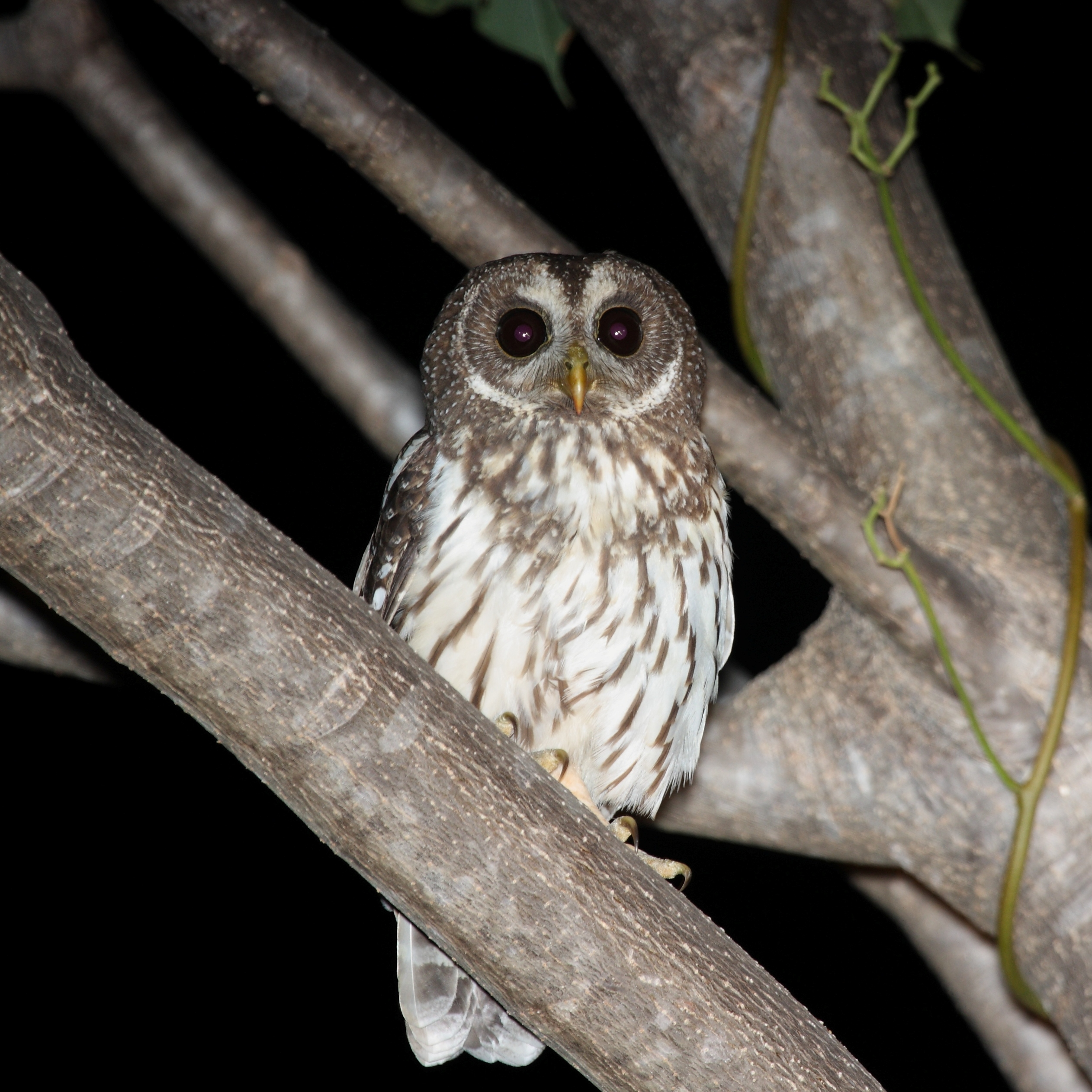

Conservation status
- Least Concern (IUCN 3.1)
- CITES Appendix II

Scientific classification
- Kingdom: Animalia
- Phylum: Chordata
- Class: Aves
- Order: Strigiformes
- Family: Strigidae
- Genus: Strix
- Species: S. virgata

Binomial name
- Strix virgata (Cassin, 1849)

Synonyms
- Ciccaba virgata

= Mottled owl =

Species of owl

The mottled owl (Strix virgata) is a medium-sized owl found in Central and South America from Mexico to Brazil and Argentina. The head and back are mottled brown and the underparts whitish, with vertical bars on the chest and throat. The eyes are dark and the head is round and they do not have ear tufts. They are territorial and found in dry forests and jungles at altitudes of up to 2,500 m (8,200 ft) above sea level.

== Taxonomy ==
The mottled owl was described by the American ornithologist John Cassin in 1849 and given the binomial name Syrnium virgatum. In 1999, Wink and Heidrich transferred it to the genus Strix, but this is still contested by some authorities.

== Description ==
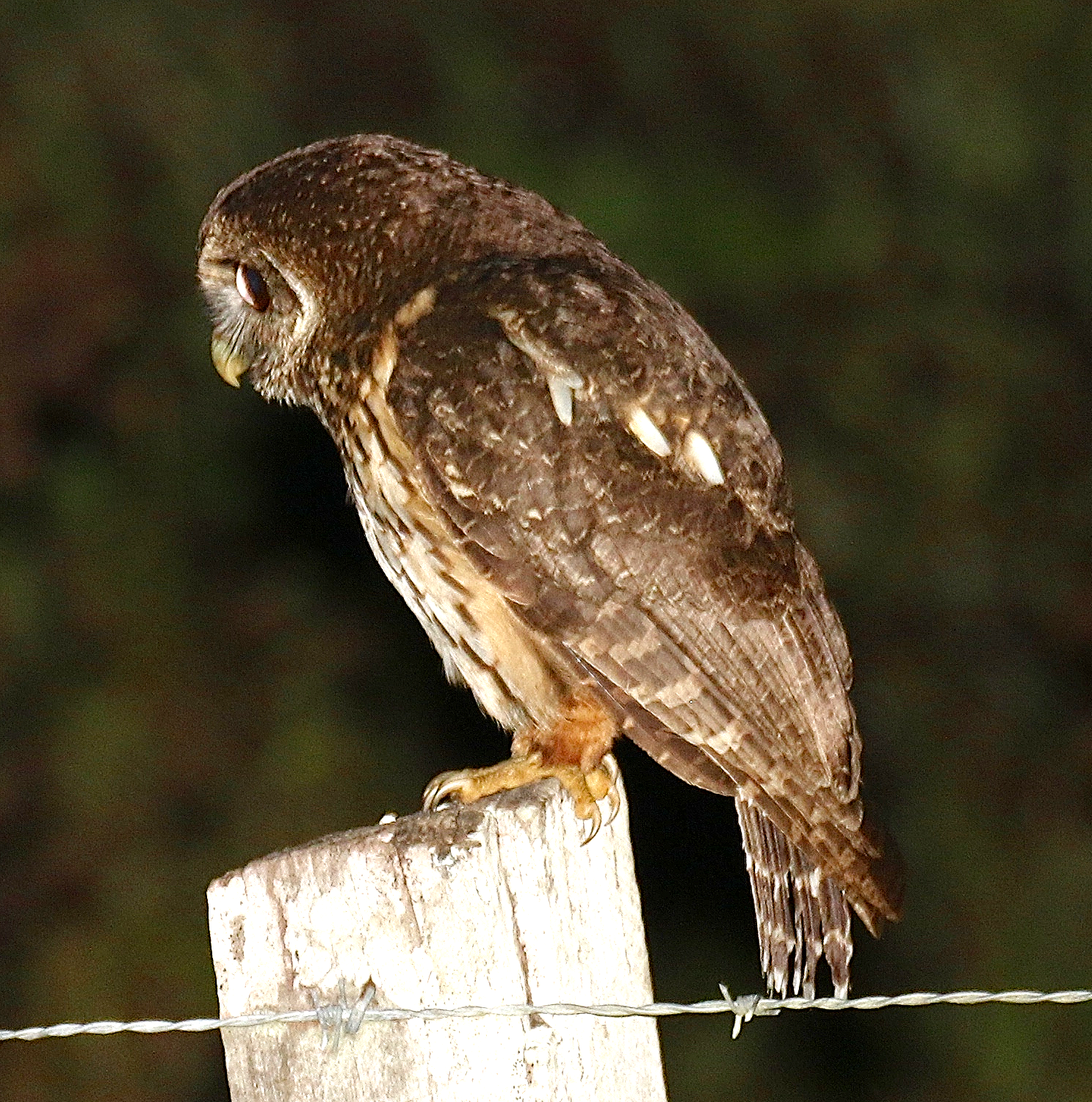
Chan Chich Lodge area – Belize

The mottled owl is a medium-sized owl with adults reaching 280 to 355 mm (11 to 14 in) in length. Females are considerably larger than males; the mottled owl shows the greatest degree of sexual dimorphism of any species of owl. The crown, nape and back are mottled in several shades of darkish brown, the facial disc is pale brown and the throat, breast and belly are off-white with distinctive vertical brown streaks. The large eyes are brown, the beak is greyish-yellow or greyish-blue, and the legs and feet are greyish-yellow. There is a darker form of the bird with a buff breast and belly. Mottled owls produce a range of calls which include a hoot used in maintaining territory boundaries, and various whistles, screeches and hisses.

== Distribution and habitat ==
The mottled owl is native to Central and South America. Its range extends from Mexico south to Argentina and Brazil and it is found at elevations up to about 2,500 m (8,200 ft). It inhabits a variety of wooded habitats including rainforest, woodland verges, dry thorn forest, pine–oak woodland and plantations and also open countryside with scattered trees. In some parts of its range it is common and it is often found close to human habitations. In 1983, a specimen was retrieved on the American side of the Rio Grande, thus establishing a first record for the United States. Forty years later, a mottled owl was photographed in Starr County, Texas, and there is also a 2006 record from the same state.

== Behaviour ==
The mottled owl is nocturnal and spends the day in dense vegetation where it may be mobbed by other birds. Its large eyes are adapted for sight at low levels of light, and its hearing is also acute. It is a predator and at night often perches on a branch beside a glade or at the edge of woodland on the lookout for prey. When it detects a small moving object, it swoops down from its perch on silent wings and pounces on its target, which may be a small mammal, a bird, reptile or amphibian or a large beetle, grasshopper or other insect/arthropod. It is known to prey on bats.

The mottled owl breeds between February and May in Colombia and in September to November in Argentina. It usually nests in a hole in a tree but may also choose an empty nest built by another species. One or usually two white eggs are laid and incubated by the female and both parents care for the young.

== Status ==
The mottled owl has a very wide range and the number of individual birds has been estimated to be somewhere between five hundred thousand and five million. It is listed by the IUCN as being of "Least Concern" on the basis that, though its numbers may be decreasing slightly, they are not doing so at such a rate as would justify putting the bird in a more vulnerable category.
