= Barred owl =

Conservation status
- Least Concern (IUCN 3.1)
- CITES Appendix II

Scientific classification
- Kingdom: Animalia
- Phylum: Chordata
- Class: Aves
- Order: Strigiformes
- Family: Strigidae
- Genus: Strix
- Species: S. varia

Binomial name
- Strix varia Barton, 1799

Subspecies
- S. v. georgica; S. v. helveola; S. v. varia

Synonyms
- Syrnium varium

Audio
- Barred owl hoots, recorded in Florida

Species of owl

The barred owl (Strix varia), also known as the northern barred owl, striped owl, or more informally, hoot owl or eight hooter, is a North American large species of owl. A member of the true owl family, Strigidae, they belong to the genus Strix, which is also the origin of the family's name under Linnaean taxonomy. Barred owls are largely native to eastern North America, but have expanded their range to the West Coast of North America, where they are considered invasive. Mature forests are their preferred habitat, but they can also acclimate to various gradients of open woodlands. Their diet consists mainly of small mammals, but this species is an opportunistic predator and is known to prey upon other small vertebrates such as birds, reptiles, and amphibians, as well as a variety of invertebrates.

Barred owls are brown to gray overall, with dark striping on the underside. They have typical nesting habits for a true owl, tending to raise a relatively small brood often in a tree hollow or snag (but sometimes also in other nesting sites) in forested areas. As a result of the barred owl's westward expansion, the species has begun to encroach on the range of the related and threatened spotted owl (S. occidentalis). Evidence shows the assorted threats posed by the invading barred species are only increasing. In response, biologists have recommended culling operations to mitigate their negative effect on the spotted owl species.

== Basics ==
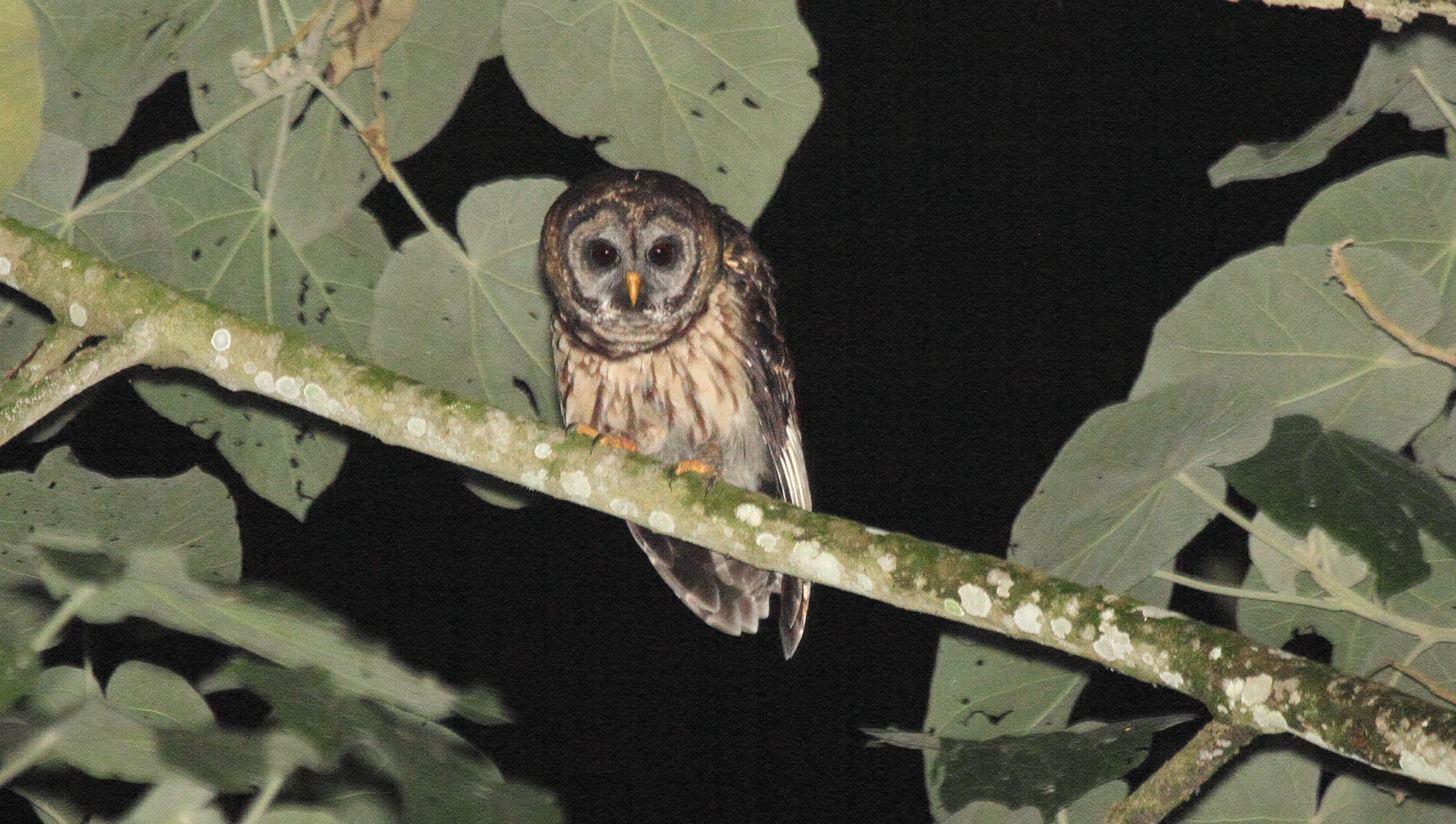
Although previously considered a subspecies of barred owl, the fulvous owl is now considered a distinct species.

The barred owl was first described by Philadelphia naturalist Benjamin Smith Barton in 1799. The species gets its scientific name from the varied directions the dusky markings take on their undersides. The common name refers to the bar-like appearance of these markings.

The barred owl is roughly intermediate in size between the larger Ural and the smaller tawny owl, but the structural features of its relatively short and decurved claws more so resemble the tawny species, as does its dietary and habitat ecology. The spotted owl has been hypothesized to be within a superspecies with the barred owl. However, genetic testing reveals very early divergence (likely at or near their ancestor's entry to North America) between spotted and barred owls. A fossil species once called Strix brea from the early Pleistocene in California does little to resolve the ancestry of modern species, given its ambiguous relationship to any living Strix species. The fossil species was larger (more similar in size and slenderness to the spotted owl, albeit with a slightly smaller skull and geographically isolated from that species) and longer-legged than either the spotted or barred owls and is now considered to be in a separate genus, Oraristrix. Pleistocene era fossils of probable barred owls are known from Florida, Tennessee and Ontario.

=== Subspecies ===
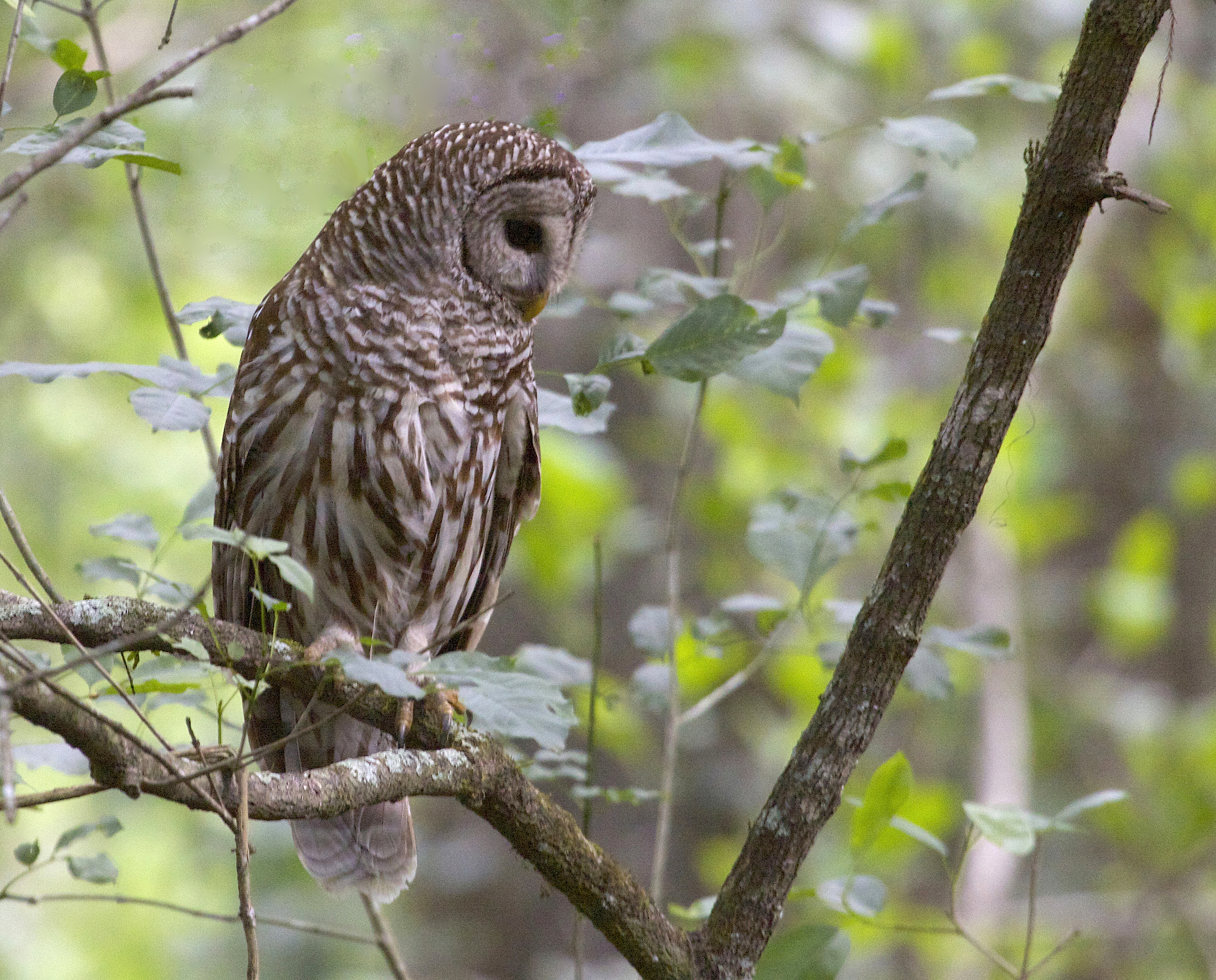
Some subspecies such as S. v. georgica from Florida differ from northern barred owls by their darker brown streaks and more noticeable bare toes.

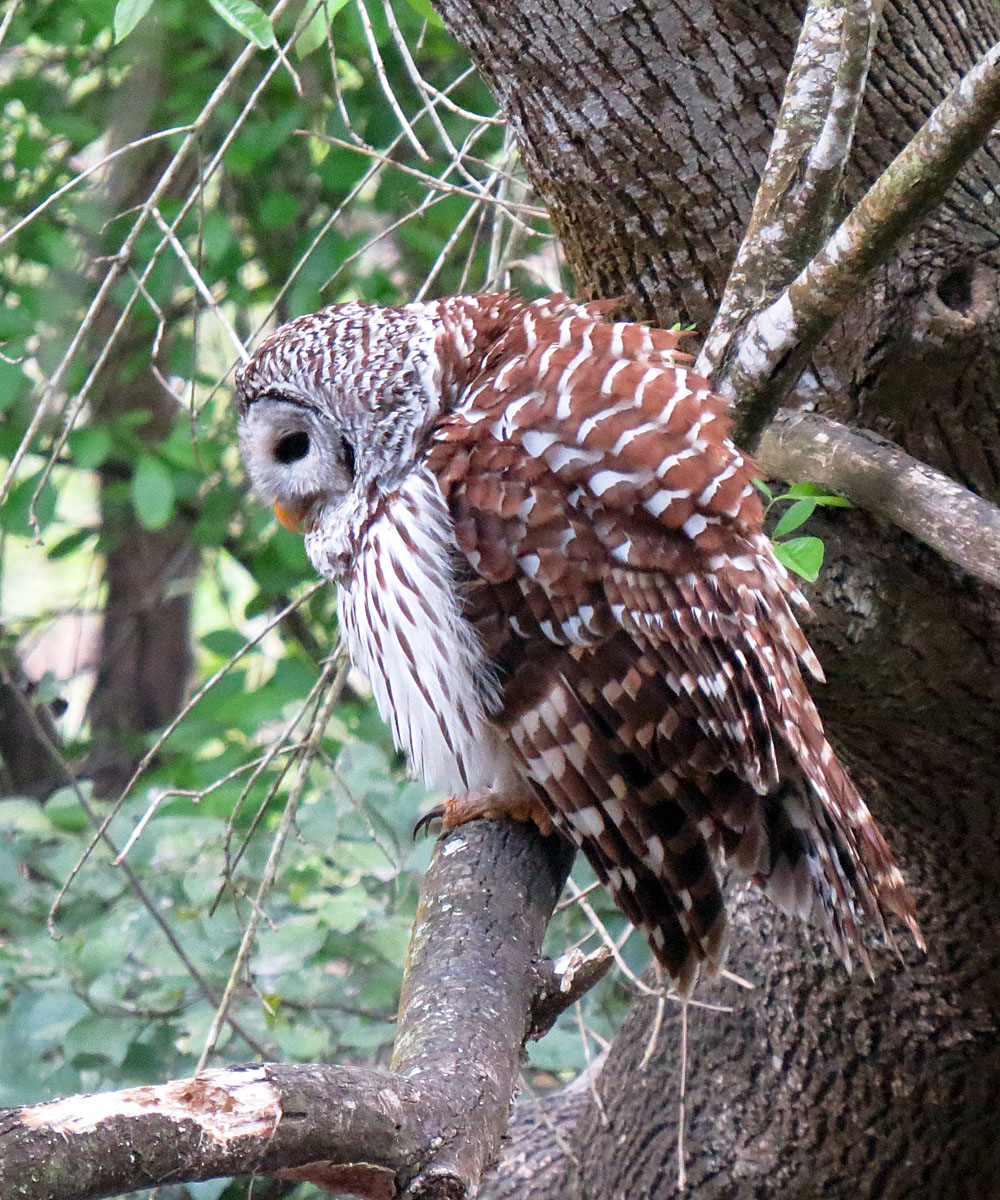
The Texas subspecies, S. v. heveola, has mostly bare and relatively sizable toes and distinctly cinnamon-hued plumage.

The subspecies of the barred owl vary mostly by region, with slight to moderate variation by coloring, size, and extent of feathering on the toes. Although several have been described in the past, the barred owl may include only three subspecies, subsequent to the separation of the fulvous and cinereous forms.

- S. v. varia (Barton, 1799): The northern barred owl lives throughout the Northeastern United States and the Upper Midwest, ranging as far south as Oklahoma, the Carolinas, and northern Georgia. It is also considered to comprise all western "invader" birds found as far west as California and British Columbia. Genetic study of westerly birds shows a substantial isolation, though, possibly up to the subspecific level, of the western and eastern populations of the northern owls, with an estimated divergence around 7,000 years ago, perhaps indicating an unknown history of the species in remote forests of northern and central Canada (farther west of what was considered their original distribution) that radiated more recently to comprise the western populations. This race is generally the typical mid gray-brown variety of barred owl. However, a paler variation with very washed out markings and a more pure whitish base color is known (in eastern Canada such as Quebec), formerly considered a race S. v. albescens, as well as darker and browner variation in northern Minnesota (formerly S. v. brunnescens). This subspecies is fairly large (described as the largest on average with the probable separation of the cinereous owl). The wing chord and tail length may measure from 312 to 340 mm (12.3 to 13.4 in) and 215 to 230 mm (8.5 to 9.1 in) in males and 320 to 352 mm (12.6 to 13.9 in) and 224 to 257 mm (8.8 to 10.1 in) in females, respectively. One nominate bird had a tarsal length of 63.5 mm (2.50 in) and the culmen from the cere may measure 23.5 to 30.0 mm (0.93 to 1.18 in).
- S. v. georgica (Latham, 1801): The southern barred owl, or Florida barred owl, is found in southern North Carolina closer to the coast along to broadly through Georgia and all of Florida. This is the smallest of the three subspecies on average. Known wing chord lengths can vary from 315 to 357 mm (12.4 to 14.1 in). Tail length is 205 to 231 mm (8.1 to 9.1 in) and the bill from the cere is 23 to 28 mm (0.91 to 1.10 in). Males in Florida were found to weigh from 681 to 800 g (1.501 to 1.764 lb), with averages in two samples of 718 and 744 g (1.583 and 1.640 lb), while two females weighed 850 and 875 g (1.874 and 1.929 lb), respectively. It therefore appears to show less pronounced sexual dimorphism than the northern barred owl race.
- S. v. helveola (Bangs, 1899): The Texas barred owl comprises most barred owls found in Texas. Its distributional range is considered to range as far north as Lee County, east to Chambers County, west to Kerr County, and south to Nueces County. In this race, the ground coloration tends to pale gingery-cream and the back and head tend to be a pale brown ranging into an almost cinnamon color. The toes can vary from rather bare to slightly bristled. This race is similar to other barred owls in size, perhaps averaging marginally smaller than those in the nominate race, but its bill and feet are larger on average than the other two races.

== Description ==
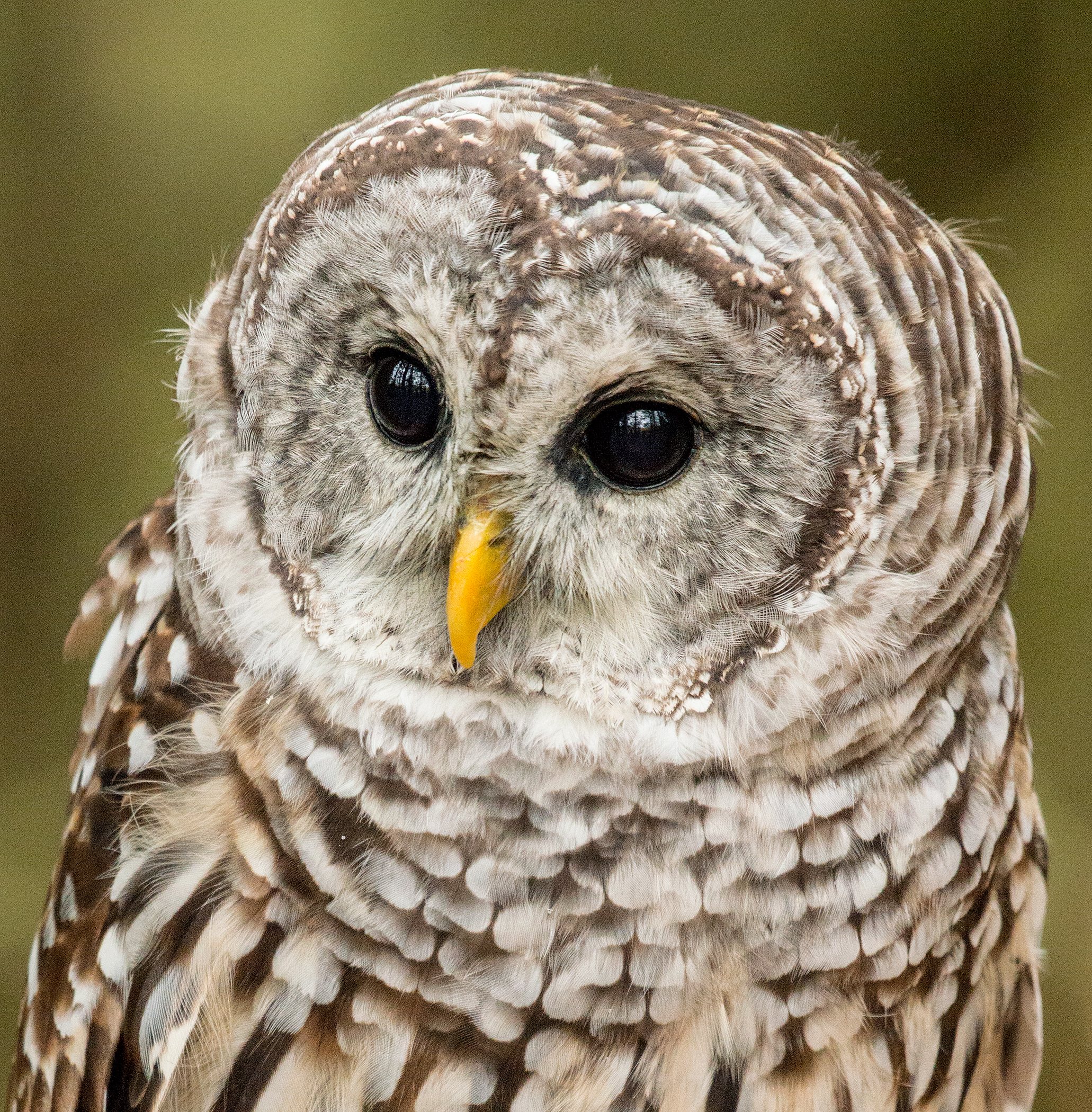
A barred owl in Ontario

The barred owl is considered somewhat subdued and drab in coloration compared to the sometimes rich coloring of other sympatric owls. Overall, this owl is greyish-brown or brown, which extends from the head to the back. Barred owls are scalloped with white bars on the mantle and the back, also bearing some whitish spotting on the wing coverts. The underside has a pale, creamy gray-brown base color (ranging into dirty white in the palest individuals) overlaid about the throat and upper chest with horizontal, slightly crescent-shaped barring (hence its common name), while the belly is boldly streaked in a vertical pattern. The streaking is usually blackish, dusky brown, or sometimes reddish-brown. The head is fairly large (although not especially so for a species in Strix) and rounded with no ear tufts. The facial disc is pale grayish-brown with darker yet subtle concentric lines. The bill is pale straw-yellow (occasionally showing a mild greenish tint), while the cere (a bare structure at the base of the beak) is "horn-colored". Its eyes are a dark brown color; the eyes may appear intensely black in the field, and although large, are fairly closely set.

The barred owl has well-developed eye anatomy. As is typical of owls, its ocular anatomy is quite distinct from diurnal raptors, especially in terms of the photoreceptor cells, as the species has a very large number of rod cells in the quite sensitive retina. However, the pecten oculi is smaller relative to the size of the large ocular globe (other large owls are known to have similar pecten proportions). The vision in limited or almost no light during a laboratory study of a barred owl was found to be similar to that of other owls, including the long-eared owl (Asio otus) and American barn owl (Tyto furcata). The tarsi and toes are feathered up to the dark gray, black-tipped talons. These feathers are sparser and more bristled in the southern races. On individuals with bare sections of their toes, the toes are yellowish gray in color. The flight feathers are barred with whitish buff and brown, while the tail is brown or grayish-brown with four or five whitish bars. A young barred owl with its second set of down feathers is fluffy brownish-white, with indistinct darker barring on its head, back, and mantle, but quickly becomes a juvenile, which resembles adults but has less distinct markings (especially about the head and neck), more buff coloring overall, often some remnant down, pinkish skin, and a pale, blue-green cere. Also, the tail at this age may have as many as seven bands (though sometimes has four, like adults). Full adult plumage is obtained via molt after about a year as well as adult bare part characteristics. A study of tail molt in Washington showed that it tends to occur relatively quickly, and that young individuals are difficult to age by state of molt alone. Southern barred owls tend to be darker and slightly smaller than northerly ones. Rare captive and wild barred owls with albinism have been described and are pure white, but tend to retain their brown eyes.

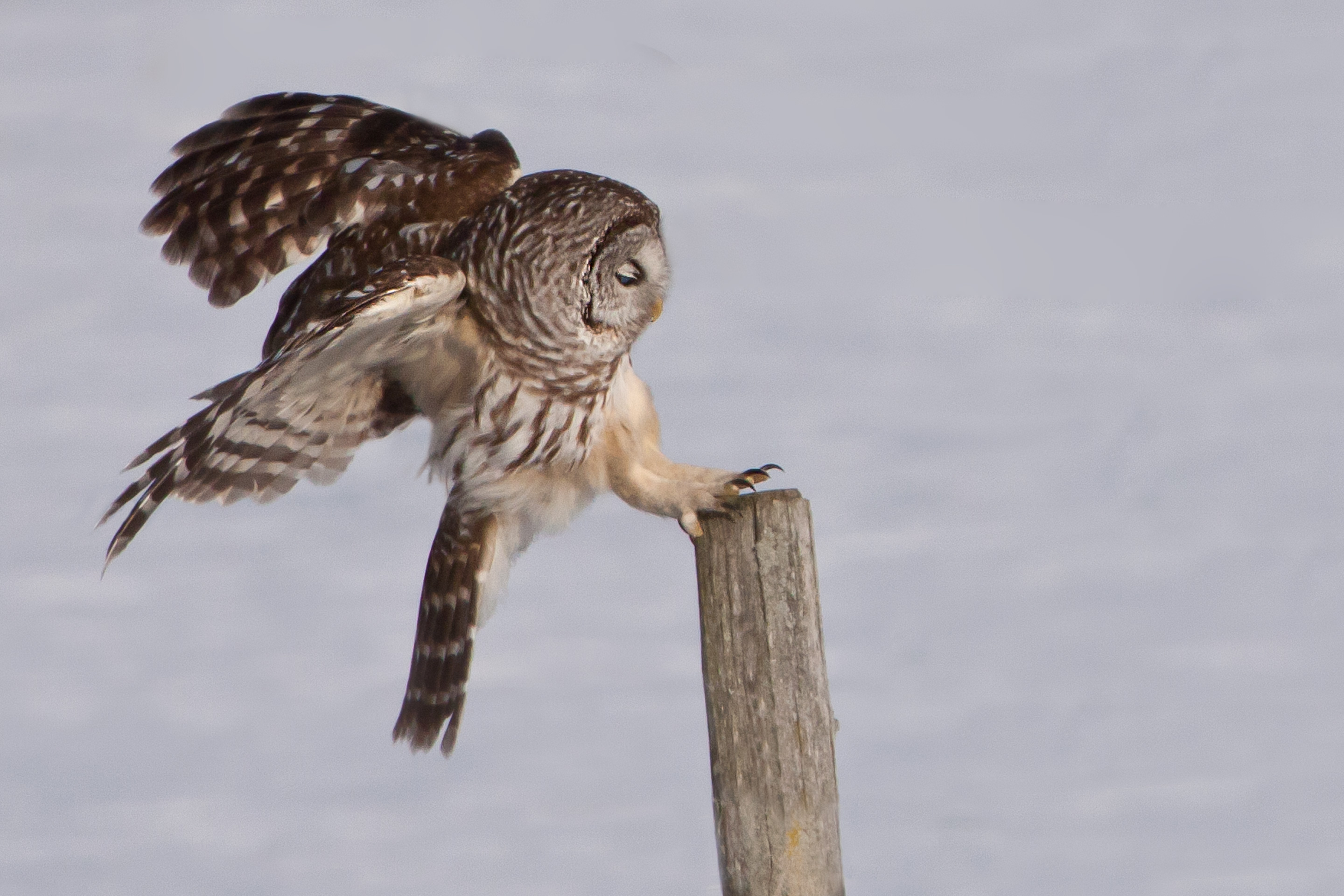
A barred owl using its tail as an air dam and brake

The barred owl is a large species. The adult measures from 40 to 63 cm (16 to 25 in) in length, while the wingspan may range from 96 to 125 cm (38 to 49 in). The wing area (measured by area relative to the body mass) is quite intermediate among American owls, with the wing loading being lower than larger, but proportionately small-winged larger owls and even than some smaller owls. The barred has high wing loading, which is related to hunting technique, with higher wing-loaded owls typically hunting from a perch, with only a brief flight necessary to obtain food, while lower wing-loaded owls often hunt their prey from active flight. As is the case in most owls, the various wing feathers of barred owls are uncharacteristically soft and bear a comb-like shape, which in turn renders their flight functionally silent during their hunts. Like most birds of prey, the female is larger than the male barred owl, sometimes described as reverse sexual dimorphism (because males are typically larger than females in most nonraptorial birds).

Among standard measurements, the wing chord of grown males varies from 303 to 340 mm (11.9 to 13.4 in), with an average from three sources of 326.2 mm (12.84 in), the tail may measure from 182 to 250 mm (7.2 to 9.8 in), with an average of 219.6 mm (8.65 in) and the culmen from the cere may measure from 22 to 27 mm (0.87 to 1.06 in), with an average of 24.3 mm (0.96 in). Meanwhile, for the female, the wing chord may range from 318 to 357 mm (12.5 to 14.1 in), averaging 335.8 mm (13.22 in), the tail from 204 to 257 mm (8.0 to 10.1 in), averaging 223.3 mm (8.79 in) and the culmen from the cere 20 to 30.7 mm (0.79 to 1.21 in), averaging 25.1 mm (0.99 in). Sexual dimorphism is particularly pronounced in barred owls by body mass, as males within a population are sometimes a third lighter in weight. In the nominate subspecies (S. v. varia), average weights for males have been reported as 621.9 g (1.371 lb) (sample size (n) = 12), 632 g (1.393 lb) (n = 20) and 681 g (1.501 lb) (sample size unknown) in three samples. The weight range for adult males is known to vary from 468 to 812 g (1.032 to 1.790 lb). The considerably larger female of the nominate subspecies has been reported to average 801 g (1.766 lb) (n = 24), 872.6 g (1.924 lb) (n = 14), and 909.5 g (2.005 lb) (sample size unknown). Altogether, fully grown female barred owls may weigh from 610 to 1,150 g (1.34 to 2.54 lb).

=== Vocalization ===
The barred owl is a powerful vocalist, with an array of calls that is considered "spectacular, loud, and emphatic". Calls probably carry well over 0.8 km (0.50 mi). Its usual call is a series of eight accented hoots ok-ok-ok-ok ok-ok-buhooh, or the "typical two-phrase hoot" with a downward pitch at the end. The most common mnemonic device for remembering the call is "Who cooks for you, who cooks for you all." Due to its best-known call, the barred owl is sometimes colloquially referred to as "old eight-hooter". At 80% of study posts in Virginia, barred owls responded to playback of this call. A further call is the "ascending type" or the "legato" call, a series of variable notes ending in oo-aw or hoo-aah. At least two other variations on the legato/ascending call are known; 56% of studied owls in Virginia engaged in the ascending type call, but 36% uttered only the closing notes. The isolated hoo-aah, sometimes called the "inspection call", was the most common song type in north Florida and the most likely to be heard during daylight. Several other calls, although some are not dissimilar variations on the main calls, are known. Some of these vary into cackles, hoots, caws and gurgles, at times described as "sudden demonic laughter", "cat-like screams", and "prolonged outbursts of cackling" and seem to be, among Strix species, an idiosyncrasy endemic to the barred owl.

Another call type is the "mumble", a grumbling, slurred, and subtle err-ERR-err, also an up-and-down "twitter" call at a high pitch. When agitated, this species makes a buzzy, rasping hiss about three times in 3 seconds, repeating every 10–30 seconds, and clicks its beak together forcefully. Females and juveniles beg with high scratching skreeechch notes. The voice of the two sexes is similar, but the female has a higher-pitched voice with longer terminal notes. Of calls, 87 to 94% are identifiable to sex in one study. While calls are most common at night, the birds do call during the day, as well, especially when provoked by human playback or imitation. They are more responsive than any hawk in the east to playback of calls of their own species. The barred owl is noisy in most seasons but peak vocalization times for barred owls tend to be between late January (in Florida) and early April (in Canada). Two seasonal peaks in vocalizations, one right before breeding and another after the young have dispersed, were detected in Connecticut, with peak vocalizations on nights with extensive cloud cover. Peak times for vocalizations are between 6:00 pm and 6:00 am, with the least frequent vocalizations around mid-afternoon.

== Distribution and habitat ==
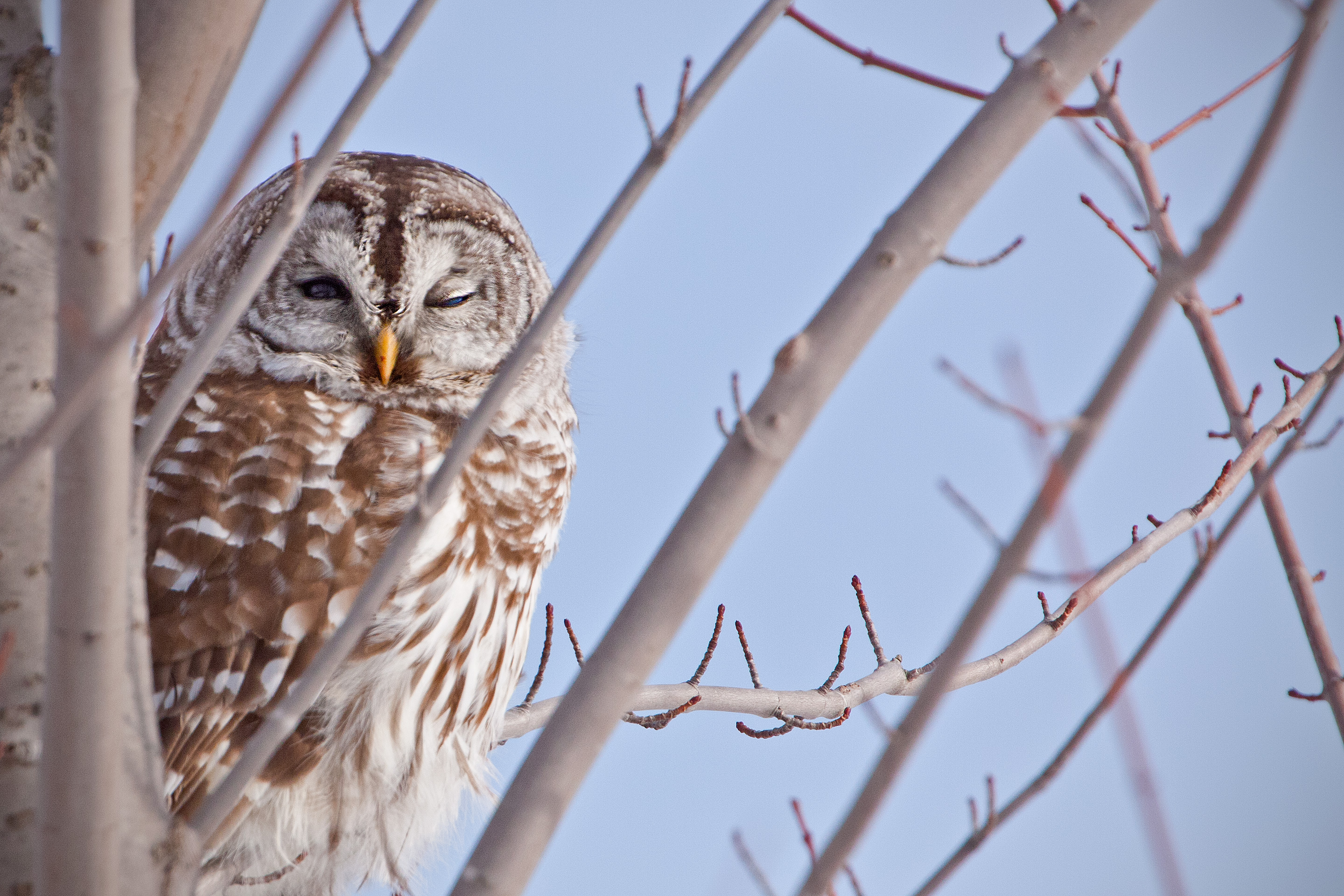
Winter in Vermont

The barred owl is distributed throughout most of the Eastern United States, as well as much of Southern Canada. They are found as far northeast as much of Nova Scotia (western two-thirds), New Brunswick, and Sept-Îles, in much of Quebec, north to Lake Mistassini, and Ontario, north to Moosonee. The barred owl has been recorded as far north as central Labrador, though the species is not yet confirmed to breed in the province. The barred owl ranges in every part of the Eastern United States continuously from northernmost Maine south throughout New England, the Mid-Atlantic states, much of the Midwest, and the Southeast United States, including all of Florida. Their range extends without substantial gaps to the limits of western Minnesota, easternmost South Dakota, the southeastern corner of Nebraska, the eastern half roughly of Kansas, most of Oklahoma and East Texas to as far west as Cisco and Burnet. Arguably and discontinuously from Texas, the species may range into central and southern Mexico, but these populations are now often considered a separate species. These initial parts of the range in the eastern and central stretches would be considered as where the species is "native". A wandering barred owl was once seen flying over Lake Michigan 48 km (30 mi) from the nearest land.

=== Range expansions ===
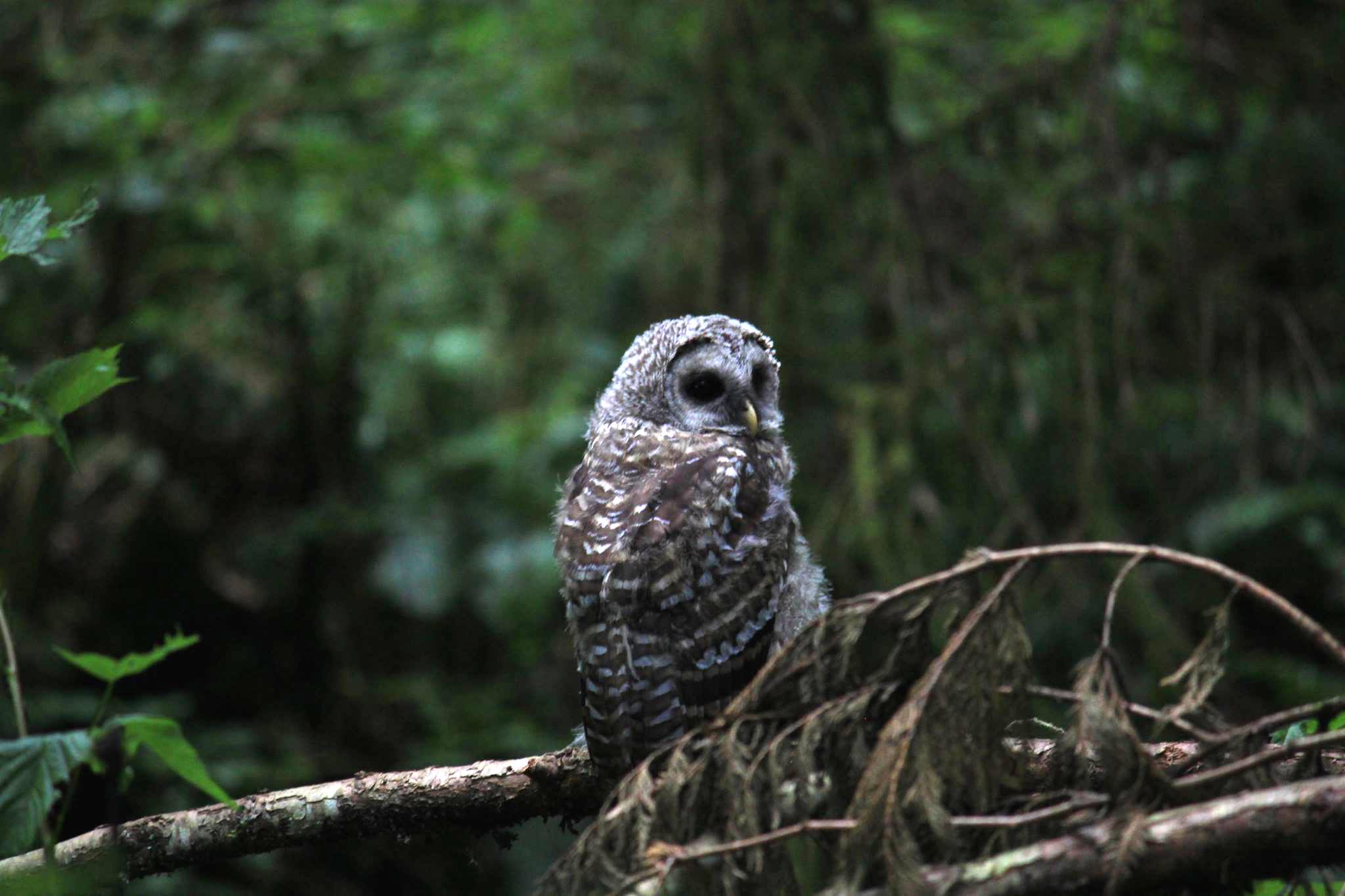
A juvenile barred owl peers out in the verdant forests of Washington, where the species is an "invasive" recent invader.

The remaining parts of the range are considered where the barred owl introduced itself in the last century or so. The historical lack of trees in the Great Plains presumably acted as a barrier to the range expansion, and recent increases in forests broke down this barrier. Increases in forest distribution along the Missouri River and its tributaries provided barred owls with sufficient foraging habitat, protection from the weather, and concealment from avian predators. This allowed them to move westward, initially solely along other forested river corridors (e.g. the Yellowstone and Musselshell), but increases in forests in the northern Great Plains decades later allowed them to connect their eastern and western distributions across southern Canada. These increases in forests were caused by European-American settlers via wildfire suppression and ceasing the fires historically set by Native Americans, as well as by increased tree planting.

In Canada, the barred owls with range expansion now are found through southern Manitoba (excluding the southwest corner), a broad section of south-central Saskatchewan, and east-central and nearly all of western Alberta, now north to High Level. The barred owl has been present in Manitoba at least since 1886, Alberta since 1932, and Saskatchewan since 1948. However, a study in Alberta has shown that barred owls have likely been present for no less than 100 years. This owl species currently ranges through much of British Columbia, where it has been expanding its range since at least 1943, including Vancouver Island and as far north as Fort St. John. The barred owl has had a further northward expansion in the west to southeastern Alaska (Skagway to Ketchikan) and extreme southwestern Yukon. In the Western United States, it also ranges into northwestern Montana and northern Idaho. Barred owls were first verified in southwest Montana in 1909 and in northwest Montana in 1921 (although reports of the species may date back to the 1870s) but not in Idaho until 1968. Of unknown origin, barred owls have been seen in Colorado since around the turn of the 20th century. They range broadly in eastern and western Washington (reached by 1965) and western Oregon (reached by 1972) (mostly along the forested corridors hugging the montane areas of the Cascade, Olympic, and Blue ranges), and Northern California (reached by 1976), now south to the Redwood National Forest, the Sierra Nevada, and outer San Francisco.

=== Habitat ===
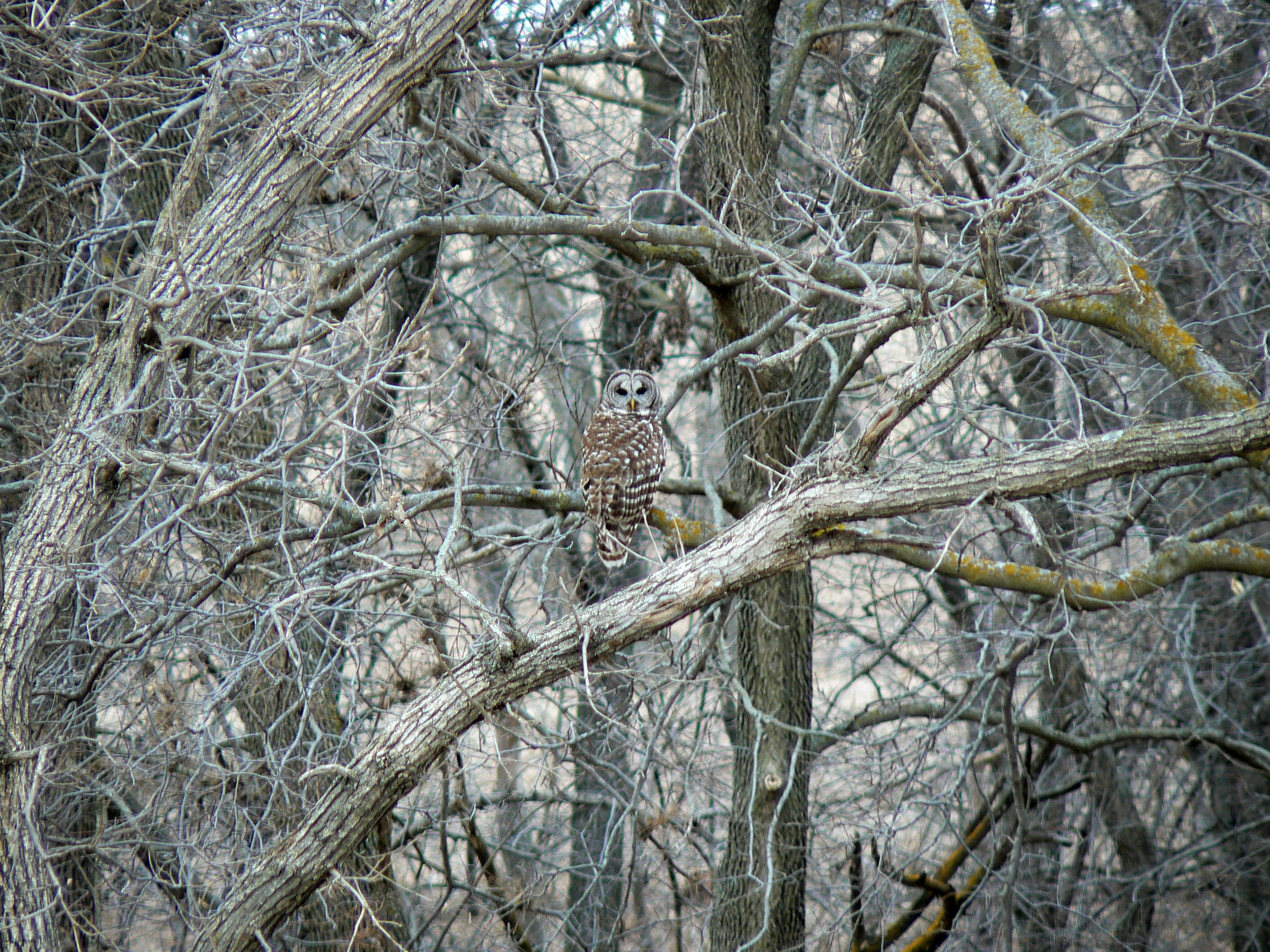
The barred owl usually makes its home in deciduous forests

The habitat used by barred owl is largely old deciduous, mixed forests, and occasionally, coniferous forests. Old-growth forests are preferred due to more extensive potential nest sites, less lower-branch density to impede hunting (and perhaps superior structural complexity to aid hunting), greater security from mobbing, and perhaps greater thermoregulation. They are often found in bottomland hardwood forests in the largest swath of the native breeding range, often (particularly from Virginia south and west) with deep, dark stands of oak, gum, and cypress. Secondary habitat, often used during foraging forays in the south, are often oak savanna or cabbage-palm areas. Regardless of area, some variety of water is frequently present, including riparian areas or swampy ground. Closed-canopy forests were preferred in a study from Oklahoma (62.8% of habitat used), followed by fallow agricultural fields (10.6%), wetlands (8.1%), and open terrain (6.2%). The latter three were visited during hunting forays, and wetlands and open terrain areas were not used outside of the breeding season. Along the Atlantic Coast area from New England to New Jersey, barred owls are often found in mixed-swamp areas with cedars, seldom wandering to adjacent wetlands or farmland. The species may be at home in wooded areas in mountainous regions. More upland wooded habitats, often in mixed woods containing hemlock, alder, poplar, pine, and oak, are typical in the northern part of their range. A study in northern New Jersey found at least 15 species of both conifer and deciduous trees were routinely used for differing purposes. In Michigan, barred owl habitat usually consists largely of some combination of hemlock and maple trees, with mixed forest usage being disproportionate to its prevalence in the environment. Large oak stands were preferred in Minnesota, a bit ahead of mixed forest and far ahead of white cedar swamps and other habitat types, which were either too dense or too open or had too few attractive nesting sites.

Barred owls are not confined to extensive forest, also dwelling extensively in semiopen wooded areas, locally in large parks with mature trees, and in forest-adjacent regions recently logged. Recent studies show suburban neighborhoods can be ideal habitat for barred owls, and the species may be considered a local synanthrope. Using transmitter data, some regional populations, such as in Charlotte, North Carolina, increased faster in the suburban settings than in old-growth forest. A factor of this suburban success may be easily accessible rodent prey in such settings. However, for breeding and roosting, this species needs at least some large trees and can be locally absent in some urban areas for this reason. The increased offspring offset the death rate due to impacts from cars, other types of collisions, and disease. Similarly, in Piedmont, South Carolina, productivity of the owls was higher in suburban areas and they comprised 41% of the territories of the local owls, but various sorts of anthropogenic mortality were seemingly higher. In suburban areas of Ohio, 41.4% of barred owl range was forested, 29.8% was low-density residential areas, and less than 15% was pasture. Studies from the Northeastern United States, though, such as in New Jersey, found barred owls breeding mainly in plots of old-growth woodlands, and rarely successfully breeding in periurban areas, in part because of competitive and predatory displacement by great horned owls. Furthermore, a study in North Carolina showed most barred owls appear to favor areas with at least 86 to 370 ha (210 to 910 acres) of woods, but did not seem to be affected by the presence of roadways.

In the Pacific Northwest, they can be quite adaptive to secondary forests, but in Ontario, where the barred owl is native, secondary forest seemed to be largely avoided. In the recent western part of the range, barred owls often dwell in mixed-wood areas, often with lowland stands of balsam poplar, trembling aspen, and white spruce, occasionally but not commonly in pure conifer boreal stands. Barred owls in California preferred stands of red alder. More so confined to inland areas, as in eastern Washington, Idaho, Manitoba, and Montana, they prefer Douglas fir, ponderosa pine, paper birch, burr oak, and western larch. In north-central Alberta, the use of old-growth forest was far more prevalent than its occurrence in the wild. In the Cascades Range of Washington, barred owls usually dwell in areas with more grand firs, taller and more diverse tree heights, more enclosed canopies, higher numbers of trees per acre, and less ground cover. In Saskatchewan, barred owls preferred areas with a minimum of 66% forest cover.

== Behavior ==
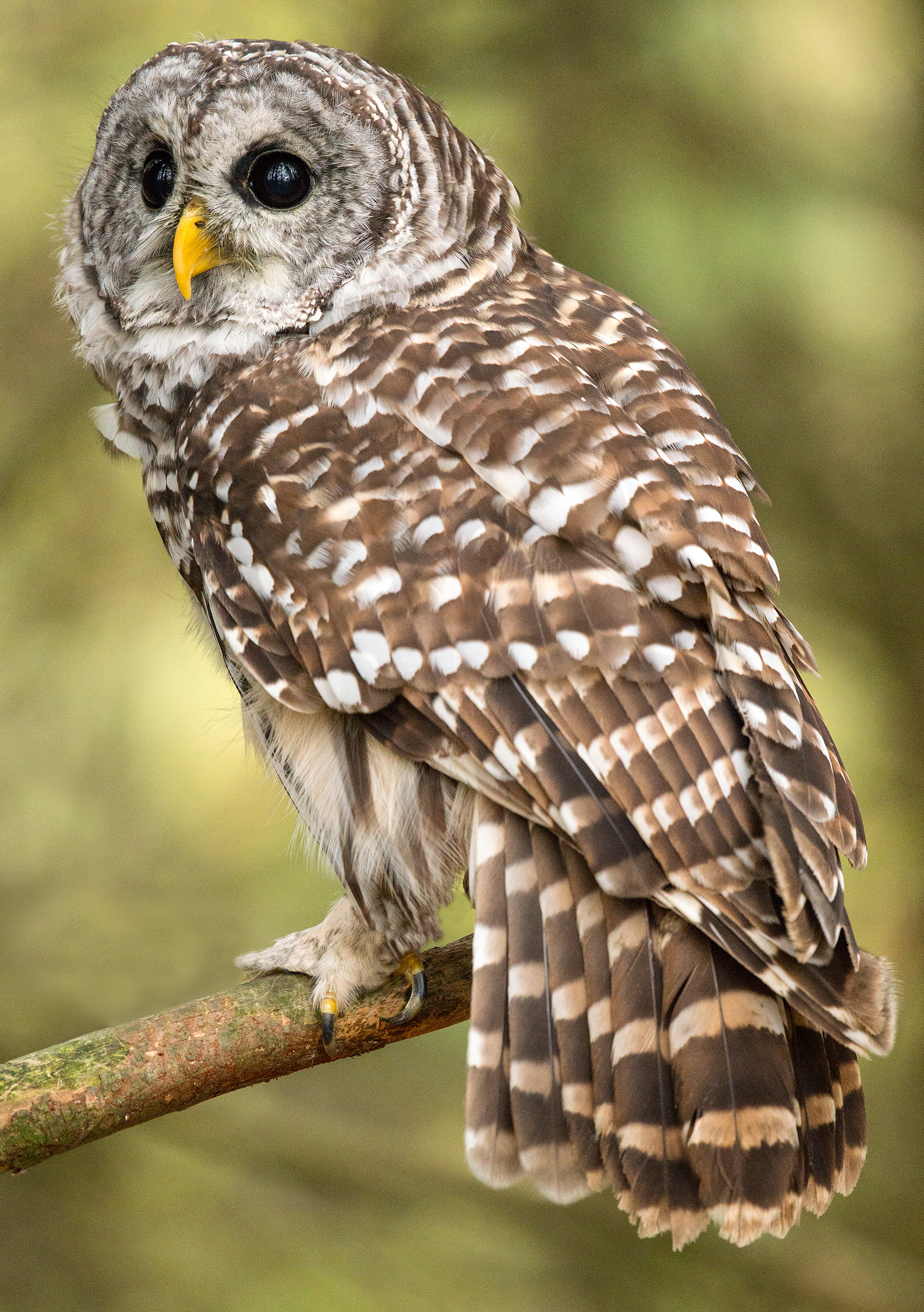
Barred pattern, Ontario, Canada

The barred owl, like most owls, is largely adapted to nocturnality. Between 5:00 am and 8:00 pm, juvenile barred owls were recorded to sleep an average of 28% of each hour. Peak sleep times in Minnesota were found to be right after sunset and just before dawn. Nonetheless, they are not as fully nocturnal as many owls and rank around sixth among 19 regular North American owl species for the regularity of their activity outside of nightfall, especially in particular circumstances such as when a rival or a human impersonator is emitting barred owls calls or while hunting. Often, daytime activity tends to be early in the morning or around dusk, but potentially at any time (overcast days being preferred). This species often spends the daytime hidden away in the dense foliage of a tree, often at minimum 5 m (16 ft) above the ground, but sometimes also roosts in a branch close to a broad trunk or in a natural tree hollow. Roost tree heights in Minnesota were typically 8 to 12 m (26 to 39 ft), while in Illinois, they were up to 9 m (30 ft). Recently fledged owls sometimes roost in tall grass, usually after falling from the nest tree.

Roost site selection may be partially dictated by thermoregulation, as in spotted owls, with shadier roosts likely to mitigate heat stress. They seldom rely on camouflage, instead often flying at the least disturbance and not allowing close approaches, making them potentially difficult to observe, but they can be surprisingly tame and seemingly curious of people in the wild. Further, they are considered "as mild and engaging" as a predator can be. Barred owls are regularly subject to mobbing by small birds, from several small passerines to corvids and woodpeckers, and mammals when discovered by them during the daytime, and such situations may lead to them being attacked by diurnal birds of prey. Some barred owls engaging in allopreening, presumably between pairs, in the wild have been recorded. They are skilled and silent fliers and frequently use routine forest flyways with open understory and low branch densities.

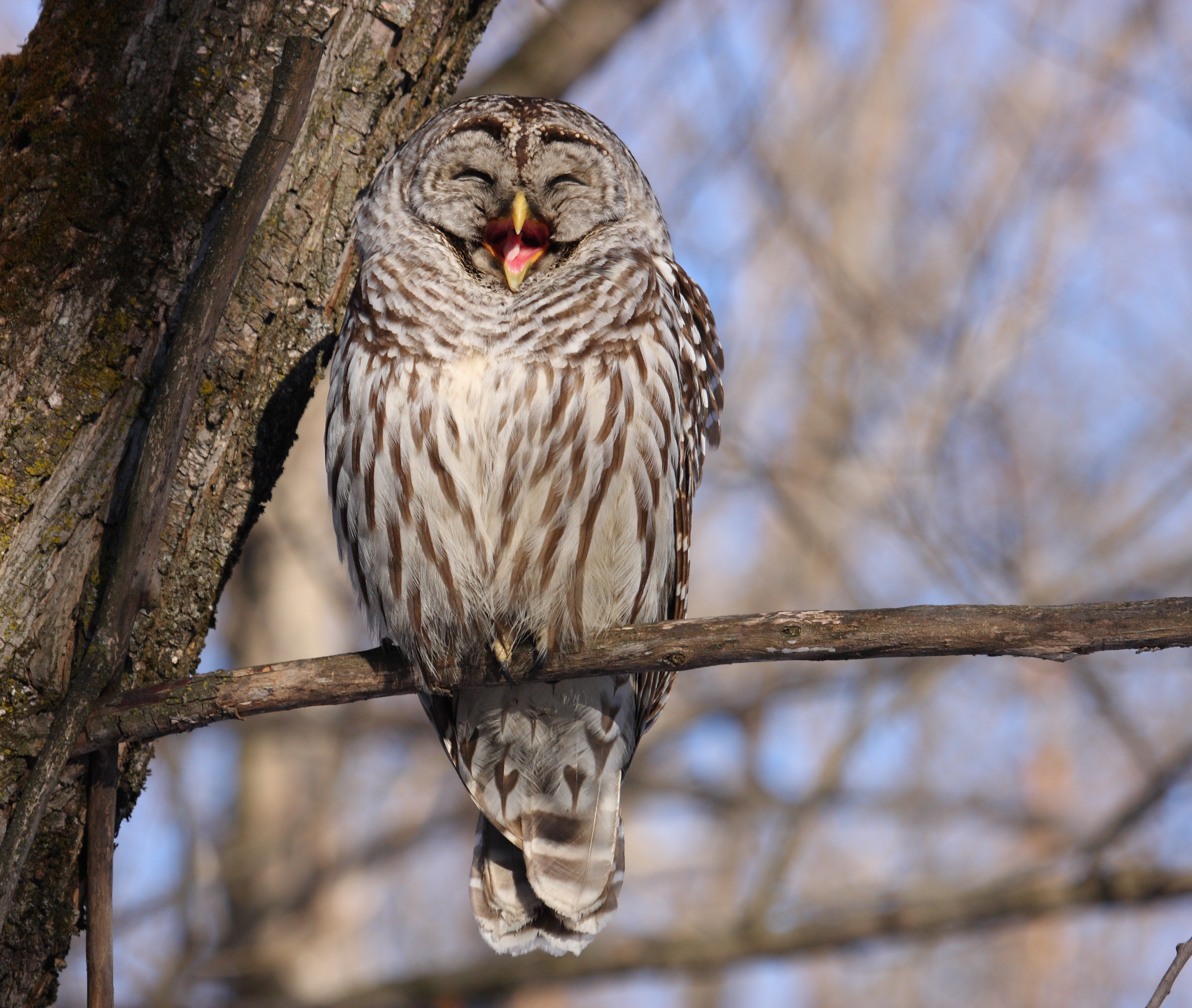
The barred owl is normally nocturnally active and sleeps during the day.

Like most species of owl in the Strix genus, the barred owl tends to be highly territorial regardless of the time of year. Territories are claimed by singing from different perches, often near the perimeter of its perceived home range. The boundaries are almost always well-maintained by barred owls and are generally stable from year to year and even generation to generation. Territory sizes have been determined by radio telemetry. The average territory in Minnesota (n = 13) was 273 ha (670 acres), in Michigan (n = 7) was 282 ha (700 acres), and in Wisconsin (n =10) was 337.9 ha (835 acres). Another Minnesota study found pairs to occupy about 226 ha (560 acres) in mixed hardwood-conifer woods. Pairs in an Oklahoma study were reportedly found every 110 to 165 ha (270 to 410 acres). The mean territory size from 10 studies was estimated from throughout the range; the breeding season mean area was calculated at 256.7 ha (634 acres) in males and 297.8 ha (736 acres) in females, whereas the means in nonbreeding season were 900.4 ha (2,225 acres) in males and 536.2 ha (1,325 acres) in females. Overall, the annual mean home range for males was 782 ha (1,930 acres) and for females was 538.7 ha (1,331 acres). The breeding range's mean home size in Washington was 321 ha (790 acres), while it was 971 ha (2,400 acres) in the nonbreeding season.

Barred owl bathing in Brett Woods, Fairfield, Connecticut

The ranges of pairs overlap in the breeding season, at 87–95%, but decreases to 45% after hatching. In a Florida study of barred owls, territorial responses, including several duets, by a pair were found to be provoked by researchers playing calls of both "stranger" owls and recordings of owls that were neighbors to the pair being tested. The aggressive response even to known neighbors in this study was unusual. In tawny owls in a study from Italy, for instance, they responded mildly or not at all to the calls of neighboring tawny owls known to them, but with great aggression to the calls of "stranger" owls. Due to its rather stolidly territorial nature, the barred owl is not normally a migratory species. Claims in the past of "rather impressive" flights in New England in the past were lacking in verifiable details. Of 158 banded recoveries in the northern part of the range, movements during winter were found to cover no farther than 10 km (6.2 mi), while all those recovered in Saskatchewan and Alberta scarcely moved at all. Little to no evidence exists of nomadic behavior, as has been recorded in several other owl species in the north.

== Diet ==
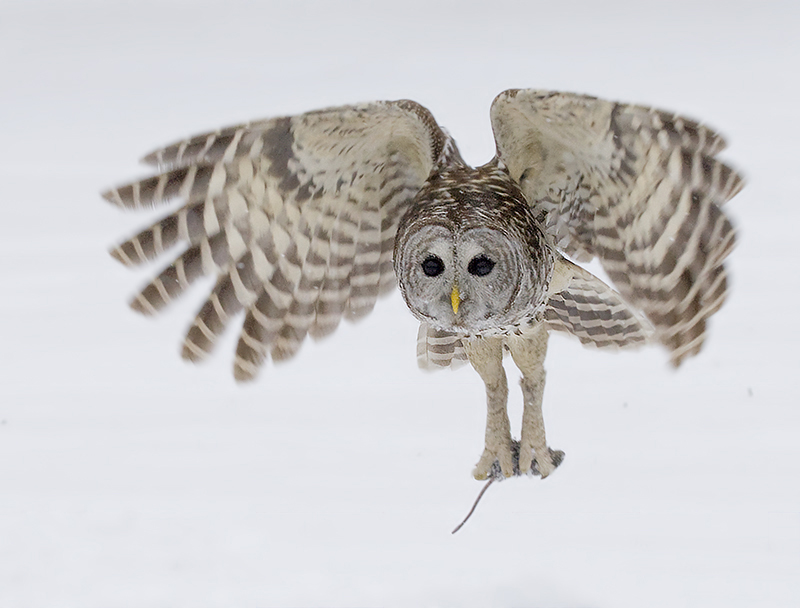
Small mammals tend to be the characteristic prey for barred owls

Barred owls are opportunistic predators of the woodlands. Like tawny owls, they usually hunt from a perch. During hunting efforts, they glide briefly from perch to perch until prey is detected. They have incredibly large eyes that capture as much light as possible, allowing for better night vision. Attacks may be carried out merely 6 to 10 m (20 to 33 ft) away from the prey due to the effectiveness of the silencing wing feathers. Barred owls, especially compared to the predominantly arboreal prey of spotted owls, usually prefer to target small terrestrial animals. However, barred owls also flush and capture night-roosting birds and capture bats on the wing, as well. Daytime hunting has been reported several times, although peak hunting time is typically shortly after sunset. Although they usually hunt within woodlands, they also occasionally hunt in open terrain, more typical of the hunting areas of birds such as the long-eared owl. Cases of snow-plunging have been verified for barred owls, allowing them to capture prey including voles in subnivean zones that they use as hidden snow tunnels during winter, a hunting method once thought peculiar to great grey owls. While hunting squirrels in the Foothill Model Forest of Alberta, barred owls were seen to make several passes before succeeding. Hunting on the ground is usually done to obtain foods such as invertebrates or amphibians. These owls may wade into shallow water to capture fish and may do an unusual amount of aquatic foraging, as compared to any Strix species or North American owl.

Due to its relatively modest foot size, it does not usually take particularly large prey. Owls in general, however, have proportionately larger feet and more powerful grips than similarly sized diurnal raptors, while the physiologies of the daytime raptors differ. While the mechanism of the killing feet overlap, owls kill mainly with constriction and sacrifice velocity with their physiology, while diurnal raptors have higher velocity and kill mainly by trauma inflicted by their enlarged talons. A majority of prey of barred owls is eaten outright, but with large prey, the barred owl may eat the head first and then return to consume the remainder of the body. Cases of owls of any variety scavenging on carrion are generally rare, but at least three instances of carrion feeding by barred owls have been observed, more recently eating deer and squirrel roadkill on a remote camera in North Carolina. The pellet of the barred owl averages about 3.5 cm (1.4 in) in diameter and 7.2 cm (2.8 in) in length.

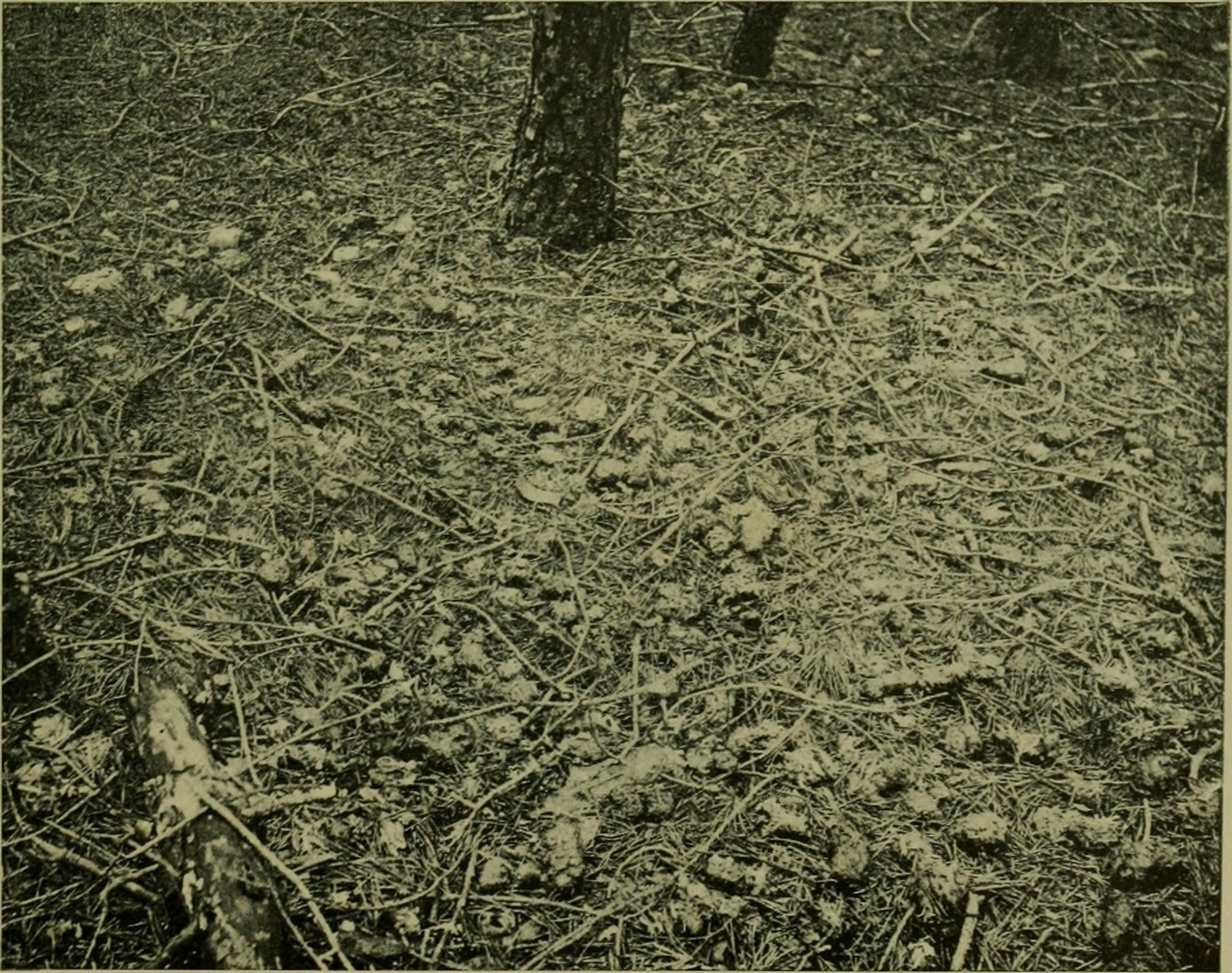
A 1908 photo of a site found with a massive number of barred owl casts and pellets near Carlisle, Pennsylvania

The barred owl has been known to consume a diversity of animals from different taxonomic classes. Primarily, these owls live off of small mammals. Other vertebrates are rarely neglected, though, especially birds and amphibians, but also occasionally reptiles and fish. For an owl its size, the barred owl also consumes a large amount of arthropods and other invertebrates. One study from a wide swath of the range found that among 2234 accrued prey items, 76% were mammals, 15.8% were invertebrates, 5.8% were birds, and 2.5% were other vertebrates. In four other studies from different parts of the distribution, the mean balance of mammals in diet was around 64.9%, birds around 13.4%, invertebrates around 11.4%, and different classes of vertebrates (mostly amphibians) around 10.3%. A compilation study that included a total of 7077 prey items using all methodologies found 71.9% mammals, 9.5% birds, 0.6% reptiles, 6.0% amphibians, 1.9% fish, 1.0% earthworms, 0.2% gastropods, 6.5% insects, and 2.4% crayfish. Barred owls tend to focus on fairly small-sized prey, although are capable of attacking larger than usual prey in infrequent cases. The mean size of prey taken is seldom estimated in the barred owls' eastern range, although one study estimated it in the general east to be 33.5 g (1.18 oz). Many more studies have estimated mean prey sizes in westerly areas of sympatry with spotted owls to understand how their diets may conflict. Different studies from the west (mainly Washington and Oregon) variously have estimated the mean prey sizes for barred owls at 47.7 g (1.68 oz), 56.1 g (1.98 oz), 60.2 g (2.12 oz), 103.5 g (3.65 oz), and 123.6 g (4.36 oz).

=== Mammals ===
The predominant small mammals available in forest and woodland edges are generally small rodents, so barred owls, like other Strix owls, most often rely on rodents as the primary prey. Preferred rodents to be taken are voles, mice of the genus Peromyscus, and assorted rats, including non-native Rattus species, as well as unrelated native types such as cotton rats, rice rats, and woodrats. These all share with barred owls a penchant for nocturnality and crepuscular habits (although many voles are more correctly considered cathemeral) While during other seasons, the diet of barred owls can be fairly diverse, the winter diet may be almost wholly rodents. This was the case in winter in Montana, where 97.6% of 1153 prey items were montane voles or meadow voles, with a possible slight mixture of other voles. The diet of barred owls in a much smaller study near Urbana, Illinois, during winter was less homogeneous, but still led by rodents, especially the meadow vole (32.3%) and white-footed mouse (23.5%). A winter food study in Essex County, New Jersey, found that among 118 prey items, meadow voles comprised a great majority of the prey, at 91.5% of the total.

An unusual lack of diversity in barred owl pellets was found in several years of possibly an aseasonal study in Ann Arbor, Michigan, where of 777 prey items, 83.3% were meadow voles. At Edwin S. George Preserve near the University of Michigan, the summer diet was also heavily rodent based, as among 146 prey items, 37.9% were white-footed mice, 22.6% were southern bog lemmings, and 6.84% were meadow voles. In a somewhat larger Michigan study, the North American deermouse, led the prey at 34.9% of 321 prey items. In Minnesota, the barred owl was counted as one of the leading causes of mortality of prairie voles. Studies of the barred owl diet in six urban metropolitan areas of British Columbia found that the diet was dominated by young rats of the invasive Rattus genus, comprising 52.8% of 688 prey items, well ahead of native Townsend's voles, which were second at 19.2% of the diet. The typical rats taken by owls were clearly juveniles, estimated at 103 g (3.6 oz), although several could be from infant to adult rat sizes, i.e. about 25 to 300 g (0.88 to 10.58 oz). The mean size of black rats taken in Oregon was 250 g (8.8 oz), indicating that here, large adults of this species were selected. Beyond the typical more meadow-dwelling voles and woodland edge-dwelling native mice, larger and more forest-dwelling rodents of different varieties can be of variable import. Numerous woodrat species may be taken and may provide a hearty meal to a barred owl, at a mean body mass when taken (in Oregon) of 285 g (10.1 oz) for unidentified species.

In different areas, barred owls may regularly hunt the diverse members of the squirrel family, despite their general penchant for diurnality. Smaller squirrel varieties are usually focused on when hunted as supplement prey, such as chipmunks, averaging about 83 g (2.9 oz) among the different species they prey upon, and pine squirrels, which average about twice as large as chipmunks. Usually, juvenile specimens are focused on when taking the larger Sciurus tree squirrels, at least in summer, but presumably a mixture of yearling and adult Sciurus squirrels are taken during winter. The mean weight of western gray squirrels taken during the breeding season in Oregon was 450 g (16 oz), against a mean adult weight around 770 g (1.70 lb). The issue of temporal activities is less pertinent to the predator of flying squirrels, which are nocturnal. All studies of the diet of barred owls in the Pacific Northwest show the importance of the northern flying squirrel to their diet. This flying squirrel was found to comprise from about 10.9 to 20.0% of the diet of barred owls (either as the most or second-most important prey species), and with a mean weight of 134 g (4.7 oz) when taken, they comprised up to 25.6% of the food biomass for this owl species. In Green Ridge State Forest in Maryland, although not numerically the most important prey family compared to unidentified cricetids and shrews, the southern flying squirrel was the most often identified prey species for barred owls. Beyond the aforementioned rodent prey, more infrequently rodent prey can including various other cricetid rodents, pocket gophers, mountain beavers (average weight when taken of up to 550 g (1.21 lb)), and jumping mice. The largest known rodent prey of barred owls are adult muskrats, which were estimated to weigh 1,169 g (2.577 lb) when taken.

A barred owl is consuming a mole (possibly a coast mole) in Washington.

The other primary mammalian prey types are the shrews and the moles. At least a dozen species of shrews and most North American species of moles are known as prey of the barred owl; 12.8% of 7077 total prey items from across the range were shrews or moles. A small sample of prey in Michigan was led by the very small masked shrew, which weighs around 4 g (0.14 oz), at 24% of 34 prey items. A much larger shrew, the northern short-tailed shrew around 21 g (0.74 oz), was the leading prey in Glenwood, Minnesota, at 36% of 81 prey items. This prey species also is taken quite regularly in several other parts of the range, as well as a closely related species. Assorted other shrew species and the smallest of the world's moles, the American shrew mole, are regular supplement prey elsewhere, especially in the Pacific Northwest. The most frequently taken single prey species through the Pacific Northwest, at 11.8% of 4299 total prey items of barred owls, was the 56 g (2.0 oz) coast mole. Usually, moles are secondary if relatively hearty prey are available in the range.

Secondary prey can include several species of cottontail rabbits (Sylvilagus sp.) and snowshoe hares (Lepus americanus). About 3.2% of 7077 prey items from across the range for barred owls were rabbits or hares. Among cottontails, small juveniles are largely taken, but rabbits as large as an adult brush rabbits can be taken. The weights of snowshoe hares taken by barred owls in the Pacific Northwest were estimated as ranging from 50 g (0.11 lb) leverets to juveniles and standard-sized adults about 1,200 to 1,400 g (2.6 to 3.1 lb).

Bats are infrequently reported as prey in most of the range, but an unusually close association was detected in Valdosta, Georgia, where most of the prey, 65% of pellet contents, and 37 total bats, were southeastern myotis (Myotis austroriparius). Barred owls are also known predators of small mammalian carnivorans, mainly mustelids such as stoats (Mustela erminea) and long-tailed weasels (Neogale frenata). Predation on small American mink (N. vison) have also been reported. As they are seemingly not affected by strong odor, eastern spotted and western spotted skunks (Spilogale gracilis and S. putorius) of all ages can be taken. Much larger mammals are sometimes recorded as prey of barred owls, but few details are known about the age, condition, or circumstances (i.e. they may have been consumed as carrion, or perhaps more likely, young or infirm specimens were taken). Some such prey species recorded have included the Virginia opossum, North American porcupine, striped skunk, and the domestic cat. Adults of all these species are known to count among the prey of great horned owls, which are better suited than barred owls to take particularly large prey, given their more robust morphology.

=== Birds ===
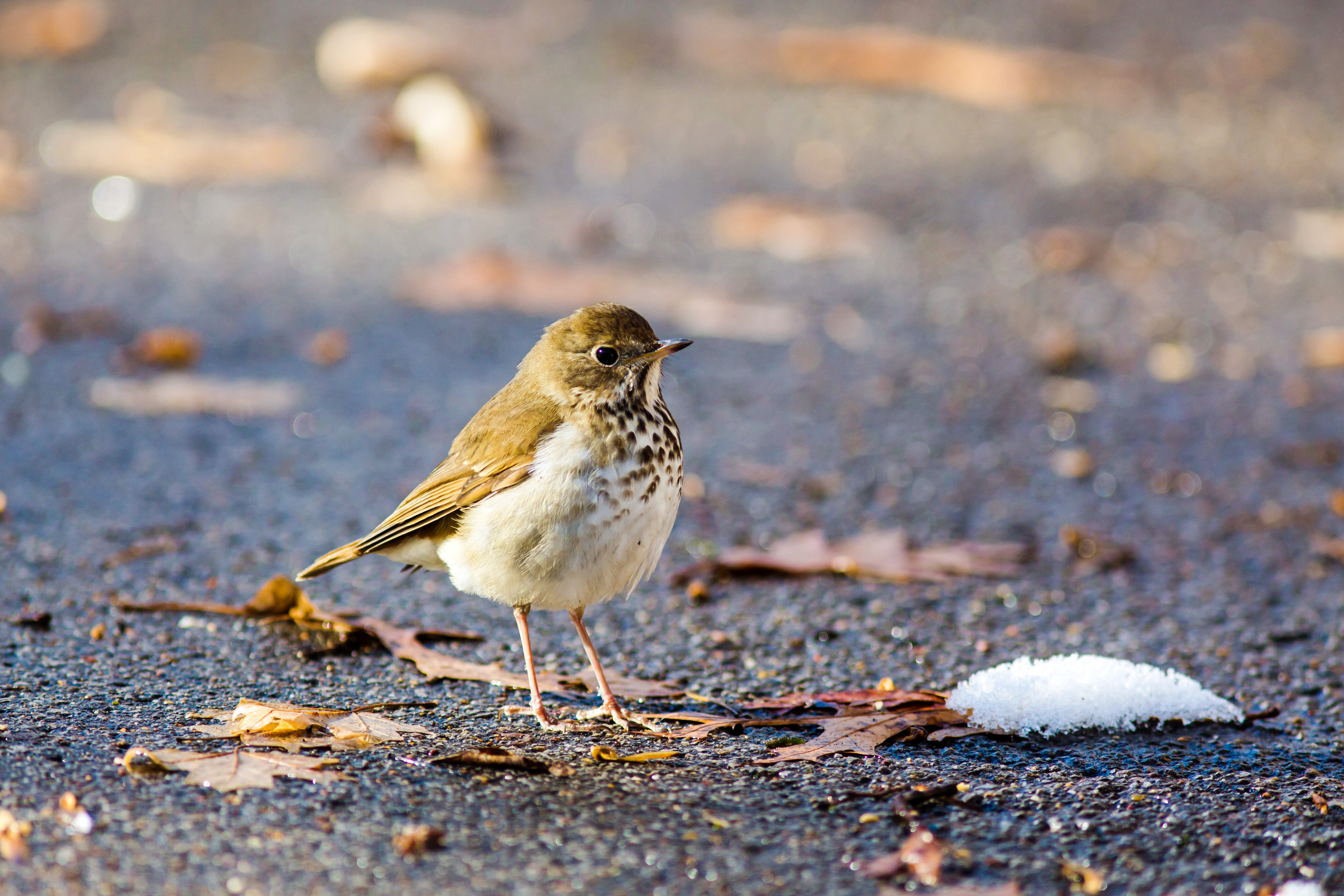
Barred owls eat fledglings of the hermit thrush.

Throughout the barred owls' range, other birds are taken as prey, although avian species make up a much smaller proportion of their diets than mammals. The maximum known representation of bird prey in a barred owl food study was 25.1% in Alberta, meaning that they augment their diet less heavily with bird prey than their near equivalent in Europe, the tawny owl. No specific type or species of bird is subject to the most frequent predation by barred owls and birds are the most diverse class in these owl's prey spectrum, with more than 100 species of birds known to be hunted. Conspicuous nesting sites of barn swallows and purple martins on manmade structures and objects were revealed via video monitoring to suffer heavy predation by barred owls. In the case of the barn swallows, all ages of swallows, as well as possibly eggs, were eaten; 65 of 95 monitoring barn swallow nests were consumed by owls over a 3-year period. The muddy bank nests of cliff swallows are also vulnerable to barred owls, while other swallow species are known to be taken opportunistically.

In more enclosed, wooded areas, radio tagging and video monitoring of various passerines nests, as well as examinations of owl pellets, has shed light on the relationship of barred owls with these potential prey resources. Not only were barred owls found to be surprisingly routine predators at woodland passerine nests, but also an unexpected bulk of the acts of predation in studies from Missouri and Illinois were carried out during the daytime. Many different forest bird species (most frequently Acadian flycatchers and indigo buntings in Missouri and Illinois) were hunted. These studies indicated that the barred owl may snatch passerines of any age, but recent fledglings are taken preferentially due to their more conspicuous behavior and limited ability to fly away. In Minnesota, about 62% of studied hermit thrush and ovenbird fledglings were taken per one study, with all thrushes that nested in the 50 m (160 ft) radius of the barred owl's nests failed to produce any young. A similarly high rate of local determent by barred owls has been found for other woodland thrushes, such as the veery, wood thrush, and varied thrush, with the additional finding that predawn singing by certain thrushes, when their escape abilities are dulled by the dim light, leaves them vulnerable to barred owl ambushes. Forest birds seem to recognize the barred owl as a threat, with mobbing behavior evoked easily by playing recordings of their calls in the daytime.

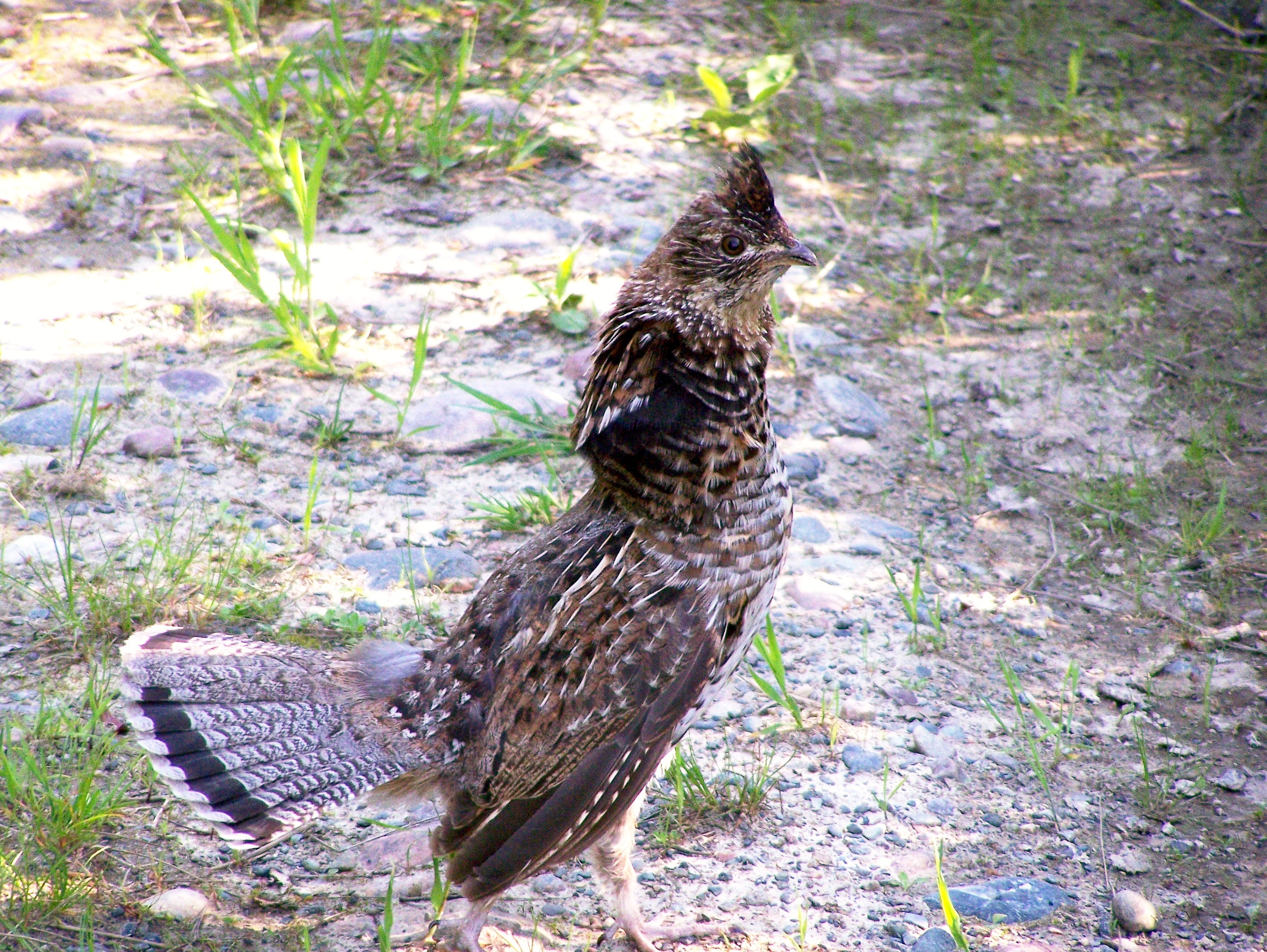
Ruffed grouse are known prey in extensive parts of the range.

A wide diversity of bird prey may be occasionally hunted by barred owls in different circumstances. Smaller or midsized bird prey species known have including different species, though usually a relatively low species diversity and in low numbers, beyond swallows and thrushes of tyrant flycatchers, vireos, chickadees, wrens, mimids, tanagers, other cardinalids, and finches. Somewhat higher diversity of species are known from the sparrow and warbler families. Birds down to the size of the calliope hummingbird, North America's smallest hummingbird at 2.7 g (0.095 oz), may be taken by barred owls. At the opposite end of passerine prey for barred owls, this species sometimes takes all ages of the American crow, from very young nestlings to adults. Numerous nonpasserine birds are also taken, though seldom in great numbers and of low known species diversity. One exceptional family is the woodpeckers, which are probably so widely taken because of their generally overlapping habitat preferences (and possibly noiseiness) with those of barred owls. Several species of woodpeckers are preyed upon almost throughout the range, including at least a half dozen in Oregon alone, from the smallest North American species, the downy woodpecker, to the largest, the pileated woodpecker. Other small to medium-sized bird species known as prey for barred owls are mountain quail, grey partridge, rock dove, band-tailed pigeon, mourning dove, purple gallinule, killdeer, American woodcock, least tern, snowy egret, cattle egret, and belted kingfisher. Although they take many chicks of gamebirds, adults of these species are vulnerable, as well. In many areas, ruffed grouse not infrequently are taken, comprising up to nearly 6% of prey items in Alberta. In Oregon, the weights estimated for ruffed grouse taken by barred owls varied enormously, from small chicks estimated at 25 g (0.88 oz) to adults weighing about 576 g (1.270 lb). Broader study in the Pacific Northwest indicated that adult ruffed grouse mainly were taken. Barred owls are also known to take adult spruce grouse about the same size as the ruffed grouse, as well as much larger species, including the common pheasant and sooty grouse, the latter estimated to average 1,050 g (2.31 lb) when taken. Barred owls are also known to prey on the young of other, larger birds, such as the American white ibis and wild turkey.

=== Other prey ===
Barred owl predation on reptiles is widely reported, but they seldom take large numbers in any given area. Most reported instances of such captures are of various small lizards, often of skinks in the genus Plestiodon, most often from the Midwest to the western parts of the range. Several reported instances of barred owls hunting snakes are also known, but they are perhaps even more seldom preyed upon than lizards. More than a half dozen snake species are known to be captured, several of which are colubrids, which are mostly nonvenomous. The estimated body mass of black racers taken in Oregon was only 77 g (2.7 oz), well under their mean mature size. However, consumption or predation on dangerous pit vipers, such as timber rattlesnakes and copperheads, by barred owls has been reported, although whether these are taken as adults or smaller is unknown. Rarer still is barred owl predation on turtles. Predation by this species was reported upon a very young river cooter, which had a carapace width of only 31.4 mm (1.24 in), as well as on juvenile gopher tortoise and apparently diamondback terrapin. Much more characteristic than any reptilian prey are amphibians, with various types of frogs, salamanders and similar species reported in this owl's foods. Amphibians were considerably more popular in the diet in western part of range, comprising 10.5% of known studies against 4.4% in the east. In total, well over 20 amphibian species have been identified in the foods of barred owls, and amphibians collectively can make up to 24.5% of the local diet (as was reported in Alberta). While salamanders and newts are probably often visually discerned while scanning the forest floor, many frogs are probably hunted down by sound during their crepuscular choruses.

Amphibians are taken almost entirely during the breeding season, as they become unavailable to barred owls during winters. Most reported amphibian prey in Oregon were unidentified "medium-sized salamanders". A diversity of frog sizes may be taken, varying potentially in size from spring peepers, which average around 4 g (0.14 oz), to American bullfrogs, which average around in mature bullfrogs 430 g (15 oz). A notable act of successful predation was carried out by a barred owl on a rough-skinned newt, which contains toxins that are often deadly to predators. Apparently, the owl was able to survive after consuming the newt. The rarest variety of vertebrate prey for barred owls is fish. Several accounts of fishing by these owls have been reported, including older accounts of barred owls coming to ice holes made by human fishermen and more recent accounts of possibly routine fishing by the owls on the St. Johns River in Florida, in the latter case using a fishing dock as a hunting perch. At least five species of fish have been identified in the foods of barred owls, including fairly large fish such as brown bullheads and largemouth bass.

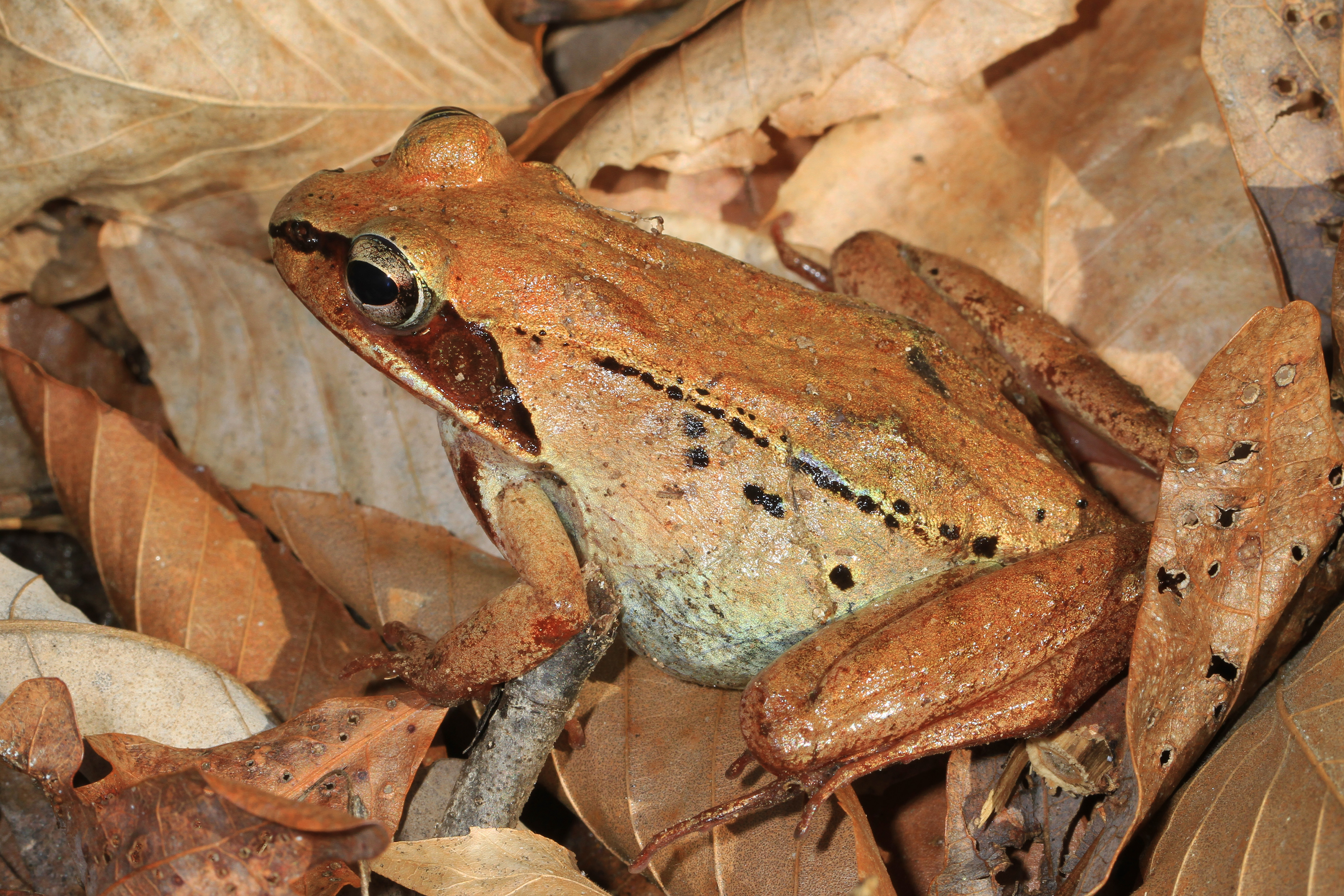
Frogs such as wood frogs are a regular prey source for barred owls.

The balance of assorted invertebrates in the diet of barred owls can be quite high. Although many of those found in pellets are unidentified to species, nearly 40 species of invertebrates have been found. Broad studies indicate arthropods (including millipedes and spiders but predominantly insects) in general comprise up to about 16% of the barred owl's diet. When hunting insects, barred owls most often prefer ground-based beetles. In Oregon, 11.7% of the diet was assorted beetles (14 species were identified), being somewhat more numerous among 3686 prey items than other nonrodent prey orders. However, some insects prey, such as luna moth, eastern tiger swallowtail, and green darner, are presumably hawked on the wing around dawn and dusk. Barred owls sometimes are known to hunt near manmade light sources and campfires, flying out from the perch to quickly capture flying insects that were attracted to them. Of 123 prey items found in southern Manitoba, flying Sphinx moths and flightless scarab beetles each comprised 7% (most of the remaining balance being unidentified mammals and birds). Crayfish of at least four identified species are another widely taken type of invertebrate, presumably snatched up by barred owls from shallow waterways. Crayfish seem to be exclusively taken in the east and Midwest, areas where they comprised 3.4% of all known food studies, and none have been recorded in the western part of the range. In Missouri, annually up to 31.1% (though, in some years, none) of the diet comprised crayfish. Barred owls occasionally feed on snails and slugs, the latter especially in the Pacific Northwest. Another snail, the Pacific sideband, was surprisingly often present in the foods in Oregon, as at least 135 were taken. Beyond slugs, other "soft" invertebrates are sometimes hunted, especially earthworms, which were most prominent in the foods of barred owls in Nova Scotia, where 27.6% of 186 video-monitored prey deliveries in Nova Scotia were worms, the most regularly delivered of all prey types there.

=== Interspecies predatory relationships ===
The barred owl's range overlaps with multiple other predators of similar prey species. Due to the time when barred owls are active, the most interaction occurs with other owl species. Of the owls in North America, about three-quarters rely on similar small mammal prey, usually rodents, with a mixture of other prey genera as supplements. Other than its ecology where it today co-exists with spotted owls, however, some level of niche differentiation is seen from a majority of sympatric owls. In the eastern forest biome, the barred owl is the only large owl species to dwell mainly in continuous forest areas. While many of the owls sympatric with barred owls over majority of their eastern and Midwestern range share a preference for hole-nesting, smaller hole-nesting owls usually prefer different habitats, such as the open country-dwelling American barn owl and the screech owls, which usually in North America dwell at the interface of forest and open habitats. Both North American species in the Aegolius owl genus are forest-dwelling, cavity nesters, but are much smaller and are at entirely different trophic levels.

A singular diurnal raptor species that mirrors the barred owl at nearly all ecological levels is the red-shouldered hawk. Both species have similar distributions and habitat preferences and somewhat similar dietary habits and trophic level. They may be considered as nearly nocturnal and diurnal ecological equivalents. In several parts of the range, including southwestern Ohio, North Carolina, and northern Michigan, the paralleling habitat usage and nesting behaviors of the barred owl and red-shouldered hawk have been noted. One of the few respects in which their habitat usage differs is that the barred owl is more adaptive to nesting in suburban areas if they have old-growth trees that provide plentiful tree hollows. In contrast, red-shouldered hawks tend to avoid suburban areas while nesting, but may acclimate to these areas during the winter. Barred owls seldom alter their range throughout the year and remain more or less constrained to the stands they used during nesting. The red-shouldered hawk averages somewhat smaller and has a more limited diet than barred owls, but probably goes after dangerous prey such as snakes more regularly. Multiple occasions are recorded where the barred owl and red-shouldered hawk have nested in the same area, often within the same grove of trees, remarkably with little to no conflict. At least one nest was found including eggs from both species. When nesting near other hawks like red-tailed hawks and Cooper's hawks, the relationship tends to be much more contentious between hawk and owl, despite barred owls sometimes sharing space or using the old nests of these hawks. A wing-clapping display by a pair of barred owls was recorded during antagonistic encounters in Manitoba with a pair of broad-winged hawks. Wing claps were previously not recorded in this species, and when recorded for other owl species, were often for the purposes of courtship displays.

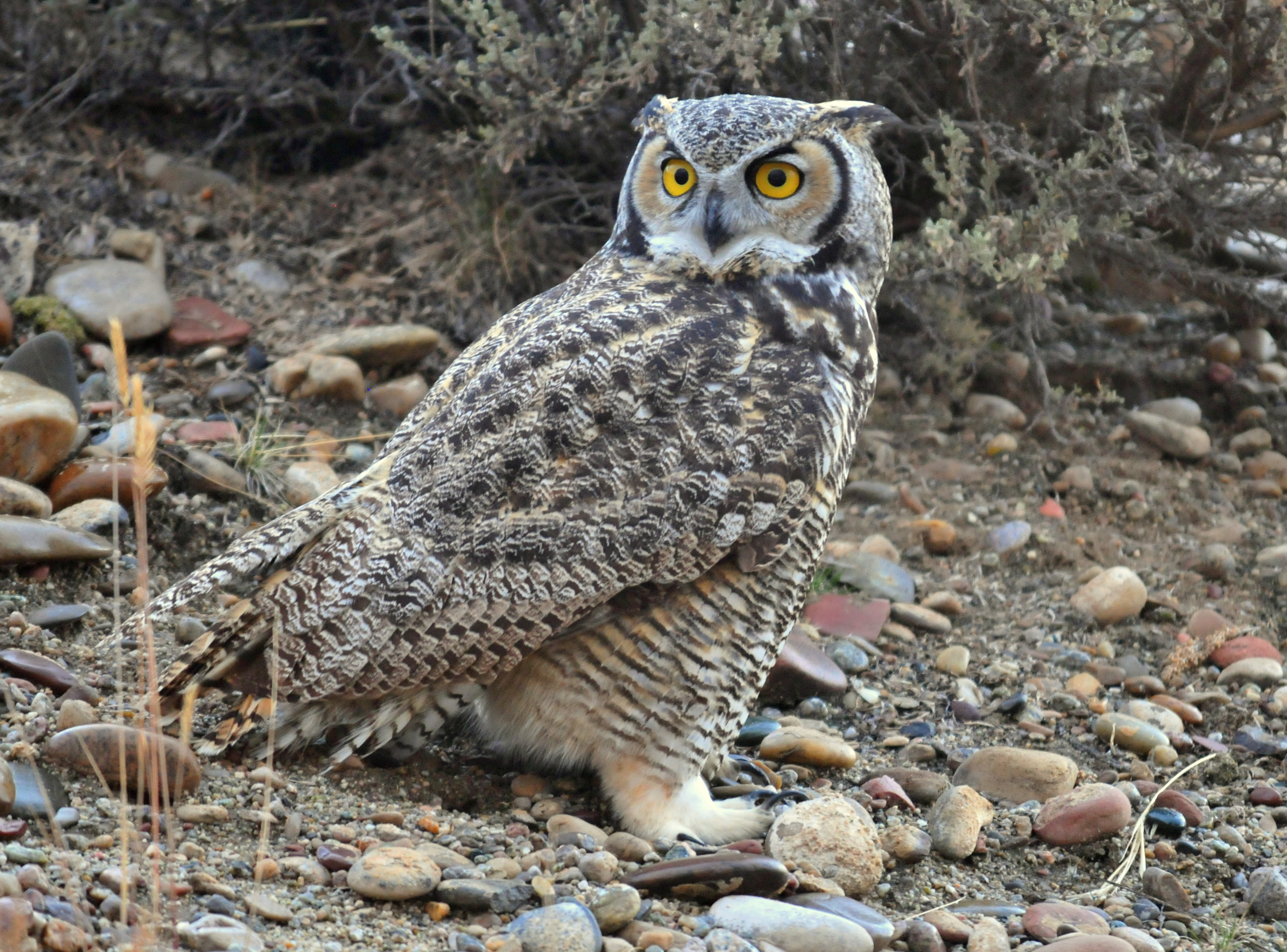
Great horned owls are the most severe competitor and predator of barred owls

One predator that is a major source of conflict for the barred owl is the great horned owl. In every part of their range, barred owls are compelled to share space with these larger owls. Habitat partitioning between the barred owl and great horned owl allows them to often co-exist. Great horned owls prefer various more open habitats mixed with trees, often in rather upland areas, which differ from the habitats preferred by the barred owl. If a great horned owl moves into an area, barred owls appear to avoid said areas, based on radio telemetry data. In much of the east, habitat alteration and fragmentation tend to favor the great horned owl at the expense of the barred owl. Where more continuous forest is available, however, the great horned and barred owl can occur surprisingly close to one another. In one case, a barred owl was observed to roost only 400 m (1,300 ft) from a great horned owl. In general, the reforestation of the northern sections of the Great Plains, on the contrary, has benefited barred owls (and may have been a part of allowing their westward expansion) and been perhaps slightly detrimental to the great horned owl. However, even where the habitat becomes less ideal, the great horned owl is unlikely to vacate an area, unlike the barred owl, which can be entirely displaced if woods become too small and fragmented. Great horned owls and barred owls have similar diets, as both are wide-ranging, large, and opportunistic owls. However, the great horned owl is larger in bulk, sometimes weighing nearly twice asmuch, with much heavier, larger feet and talons. Great horned owl have a more powerful grip strength and access to a wider variety of prey than barred owls, which take fewer prey species because they occur in more limited habitats and have a smaller overall distribution. A study utilizing stable isotopes in Alberta appeared to confirm that the great horned owl preys on nearly twice as many prey species as does the barred owl.

The great horned owl is indeed likely to be the greatest natural enemy of the barred owl. Several accounts have the horned owl species preying on nestlings, fledglings, and adults of the barred owl. Other than horned owls, predation of the barred owl seems to be fairly rare outside of the nestling age, both due to the owl's relatively large size and its nesting habits, most often in secluded tree hollows. One more virulent nest predator is likely to be raccoons (Procyon lotor), which can nearly decimate both tree hollow and stick nest locations of almost any kind of bird, especially in periurban areas, where they largely exist without controlling predators. Both the American marten and the fisher are known to be nest predators of barred owls, in turn appearing to cause the owls to switch nest sites. Other birds of prey may be an occasional threat to barred owls. American goshawks have reportedly killed both young and adult barred owls. One modern account mentions predation by a goshawk on a nestling barred owl (i.e. weight about 392 g (13.8 oz)). A well-known instance of a goshawk attack on an adult barred owl concluded with the owl and goshawk killing one another. Some very rare, singular cases of predation on barred owls (age unknown) are known by red-tailed hawks, which nonetheless generally appear to be a less menacing co-inhabitant than goshawks. More surprisingly, a Cooper's hawk, a smaller species of raptor, was observed to apparently prey upon a full-grown barred owl in British Columbia. An American alligator was reported to have preyed on a barred owl in at least one instance.

The barred owl, conversely, is a significant predator of smaller raptor species, as well. Most smaller owls that co-exist with barred owls are at occasional risk of predation. A particular cause of concern in predations by barred owls has been their encroachment into the areas inhabited by western screech owl (Megascops kennicotti). Several instances of predation have been noted on the screech owls and the recent, unprecedented presence of the barred owls appears to have a correlation with the decline of the western screech owl in British Columbia and Bainbridge Island, Washington. In one instance, a biologist who called in an eastern screech owl (Megascops asio) in Ohio observed it to be immediately captured and consumed by a barred owl. The barred owl is a serious predator of eastern screech owls, but is less deadly to them in general than the great horned owl. Various additional owl species known to be preyed upon by barred owls including the flammulated owl (Psiloscops flammeolus), northern pygmy owl (Glaucidium gnoma), northern saw-whet owl (Aegolius acadius) and long-eared owl (Asio otus). The interspecific owl trophic chain was perhaps most conspicuous in a case where a barred owl that was shot in New England was found to have a long-eared owl inside its stomach, which in turn had an eastern screech owl in its own stomach. More unexpectedly, barred owls may even prey on other Strix species. As many as four records of circumstantial but likely predation by barred owls on spotted owls have been reported. A likely event of predation by a barred owl on an adult great grey owl was observed. The authors hypothesized that the victim may have been a smaller male great grey owl (which can be about the same body mass as a large female barred owl), but this is the only known instance to date of a great gray owl being killed by another species of Strix owl. Barred owls have been known to take adults (or full-grown juveniles) of diurnal raptors, as well, including snail kites, Cooper's hawks, sharp-shinned hawks, and possibly swallow-tailed kites.

== Reproduction ==
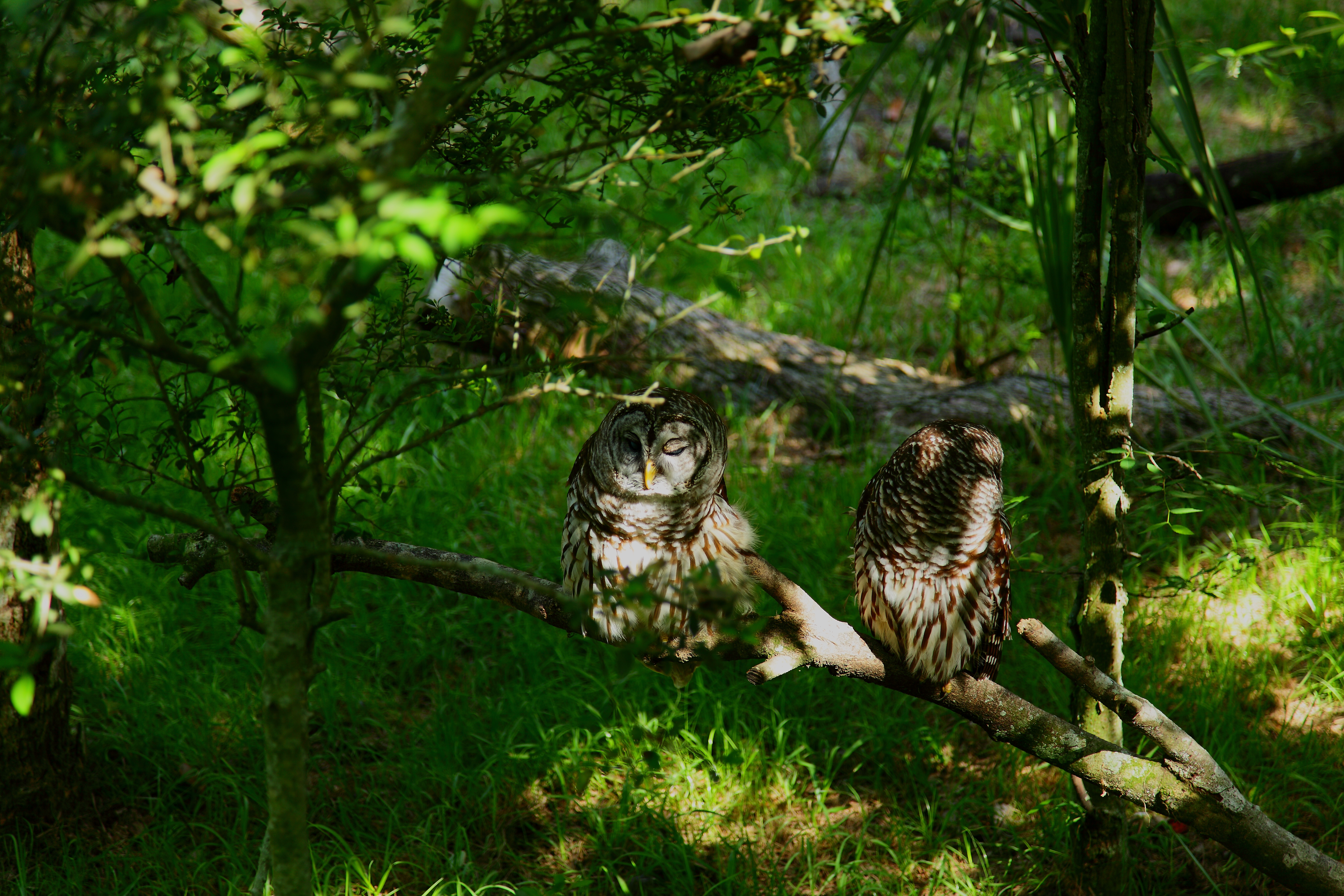
A probable mated pair of barred owl adults in daytime

The barred owl's preferred nest site is usually the hollow trunk of a large tree or the broken-off snag from a large tree branch. Hollows or snags may be made by any variety of sources, often due to a disease or storm, with hollows and snags large enough to accommodate these birds usually only occurring in an old-growth tree. Typically, nest sites are in rather deep and dark wooded areas, often with a well-developed understory but somewhat sparse lower branches, and may be fairly close to water. Average nest heights are between 6.8 and 13.4 m (22 and 44 ft) above the ground. In 25 studies from throughout the range, mean nest tree height was 18.2 m (60 ft) - lowest mean from Florida, where it was 5.9 m (19 ft); the highest from Oregon, where it was 28 m (92 ft), mean nest tree diameter was 65.7 cm (25.9 in) (thinnest mean in Saskatchewan at 47.4 cm (18.7 in); thickest in Washington at 106 cm (42 in)), while the mean height of the tree cavity used from these studies was 9.8 m (32 ft).

A big beech with a rotting core, encompassing a large cavity reached through a deep crevice, is an ideal nest site. The most widely reported nesting trees in breeding cards were elms (21%) and beeches (15%), followed by oaks, hickories, yellow birches, sycamores, aspens, maples, and poplars. In Washington, the most often used nest trees were balsam poplar, Douglas fir and grand fir. Balsam poplar comprised 62% of known nest sites in Manitoba, as well. In Maryland, the snags used were significantly higher than the average height of miscellaneous snags available in environment. The mean size of tree holes the owls used in Maryland was 33 cm (13 in) in inside diameter and 54 cm (21 in) in depth. These were slightly larger than the average from Michigan, in which the hollow used averaged 25 cm (9.8 in) in mean diameter and 35 cm (14 in) in mean depth. Record depth tree cavities used by barred owls was around 2.4 m (7.9 ft) deep from the opening on the tree. One study of cavity-nesting birds in Ontario found that the barred owl preferred to nest in the most massive trees of any cavity nester in the study area. In continuous bottomland forest, nests are often about every 226 ha (560 acres). Territory lines often remain the same even after the original owls are replaced entirely by a new pair. In Nova Scotia, some pairs may prospect a potential nest site as much as year before they use it. Despite usually using sickly or dying trees, some nests have found in partially hollow but still living oaks.

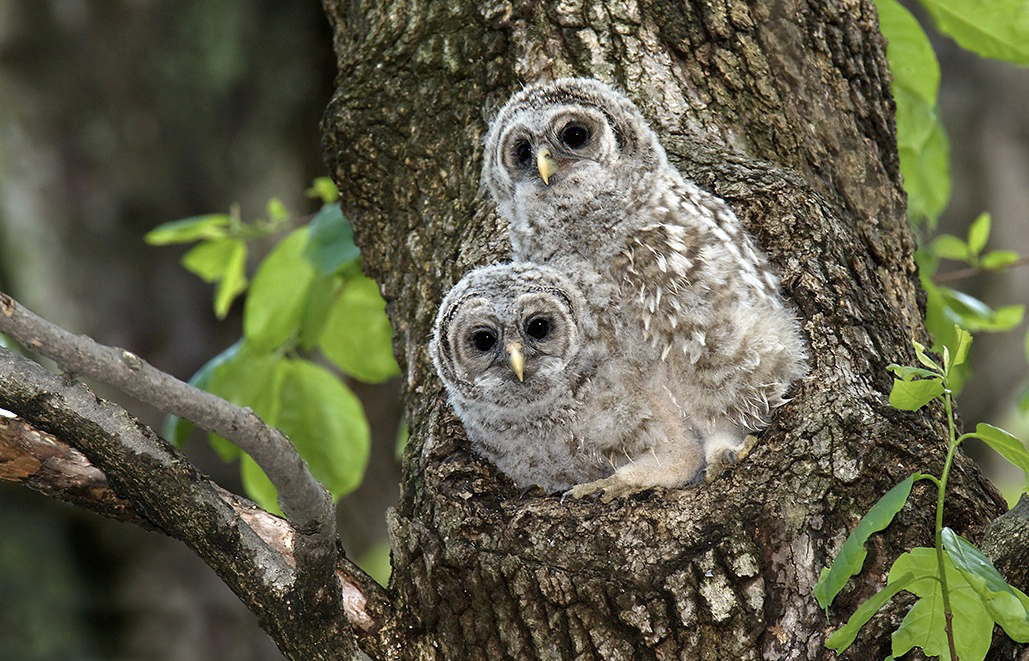
Barred owl nestlings peer out of the typical nesting site, a spacious tree hollow.

Usually in areas with few or no natural tree hollows, often within younger secondary forests or overharvested areas, this species uses other birds' nests and occasionally also the dreys of squirrels. The preference of barred owls for hollows and snags over bird nests is due to their earlier nest type having a more secure microclimate with better shelter (additionally, owl nests in hollows generally tend to be somewhat less vulnerable to predation than those of owls using old bird nests). Nests built by other birds that are most widely used are probably red-shouldered hawks and Cooper's hawks, while those of red-tailed hawks, usually being in more open areas, are used secondarily outside of a local basis. In the south, nests have been found between fronds of palmetto palm leaves, in holes of broken palm stems, and rotten snags of the palms. One unconventional nest was on the ground at the base of a lookout tower in Everglades National Park. Another was on the roof of a shed in Saskatchewan. Yet another was in an earthen bank in Texas. Locally, barred owls can take to nest boxes but, in general, barred owls take to these less readily than their cousin Strix owls in Europe. Suitable nesting hollows may be used quite often in subsequent years, with records of a single hollow seeing up to 25 years of barred owl use (presumably not by the same owls, however). Other long-used nests were one reused in New England for 10 years by the same pair until it rotted out, and a nest box in Nova Scotia was reused 10 times over 16 years. Over 6 years in Minnesota, 14 nest boxes were reused; seven were used once, six were used twice, and one was used three times. Like all owls, barred owls never construct their nests, but they may press or dig slightly if soil is present or remove the top leaves from a squirrel drey.

In normal circumstances, barred owls tend to pair bond for life. Courting pairs are usually newly mature birds, but also possibly widowed owls or those re-establishing existing pair bonds after the winter. During courtship, barred owl males especially may engage in nodding, bowing with half-spread wings, and may wobble and twist their heads from side to side. Courting pairs often engage in duets. Copulation between pairs usually occurs in late winter, February to March, and occurs several times, probably to ensure implantation. The female enters a prebreeding lethargy stage wherein she is fed by the male. In barred owls, egg laying occurs at 2- to 3-day intervals, typically beginning in March and running throughout April. In more tropical locales such as Florida, egg laying may occur as early as late December, though 22 were laid between early January and early March. At similar latitudes in Texas, 22 first eggs were laid between as early as mid-February to as late as early June (although the latter may have been a replacement clutch); 23 clutches in Iowa and Illinois were initiated between late February and late April, with roughly corresponding initial egg dates in New Jersey and probably western Maryland, as well. In New England, 63 initial eggs were laid between mid-March and mid-May. Further north, 38 clutches in Nova Scotia were initiated between late March and late May, with initial clutch dates about a week later in Ontario. Normally. the female lays two or three eggs, although as many as five are possible, directly on the base of the nest site. The mean clutch size in three broad samples from several parts of the range was between 2.22 and 2.46. In Minnesota, the mean clutch size was 2.68. The eggs are pure white, slightly rough and not glossy, and oval in shape. In 157 eggs, the length of the egg measured from 42.5 to 55.5 mm (1.67 to 2.19 in), while the diameter ranged from 37.5 to 45.3 mm (1.48 to 1.78 in), with a mean of 50.6 by 43.3 mm (1.99 by 1.70 in); 25 eggs in Nova Scotia averaged slightly smaller at 49 by 41 mm (1.9 by 1.6 in). The mean weight of the egg is around 45.5 g (1.60 oz). Only the female incubates, doing so for about 28 days, while the male gathers food for her.

The female tends to closely brood the young for three weeks. Then after, she begins to hunt for the young. Both parents normally continue hunt for the young until they are about 6 weeks old and can fly well. During the first 3 weeks, the male does all prey deliveries, either bringing prey directly into the nest or leaving prey for the female at the nest entrance or on a nearby branch. The mean number of prey deliveries when the young are 6–10 days old is 2.4 per night, 1.4 when they are 11–15 days old, 3.6 when they are 16–20 days old, and 2.2 when they are 21–25 days old. He continues hunting until the young disperse. The female's prey deliveries are much more frequent when she resumes hunting, ranging from of 4.8 to 8.0 deliveries on average by location nightly. Male prey deliveries are often sporadic through the night, while female deliveries tend to be clustered immediately after sunset or just before sunrise. Barred owls have a variable reaction to human disturbance. Some parent owls remain sitting, while some leave the nest upon a person's approach; some attack people climbing to the nest, as well as those approaching young on or near the ground. Several accounts indicate barred owls engage in fierce nest defense against humans, sometimes reportedly knocking people out of trees. However, their aggression is variable, and based on studies of similar owls like tawny and Ural owls from Europe, attacks only tend to occur when intrusions and disturbances by humans are frequent. A distraction display was recorded by a female barred owl when humans approached. In it, she spread and quivered her wings and engaged in chittering and squealing, somewhat similar to the sounds made by begging young.

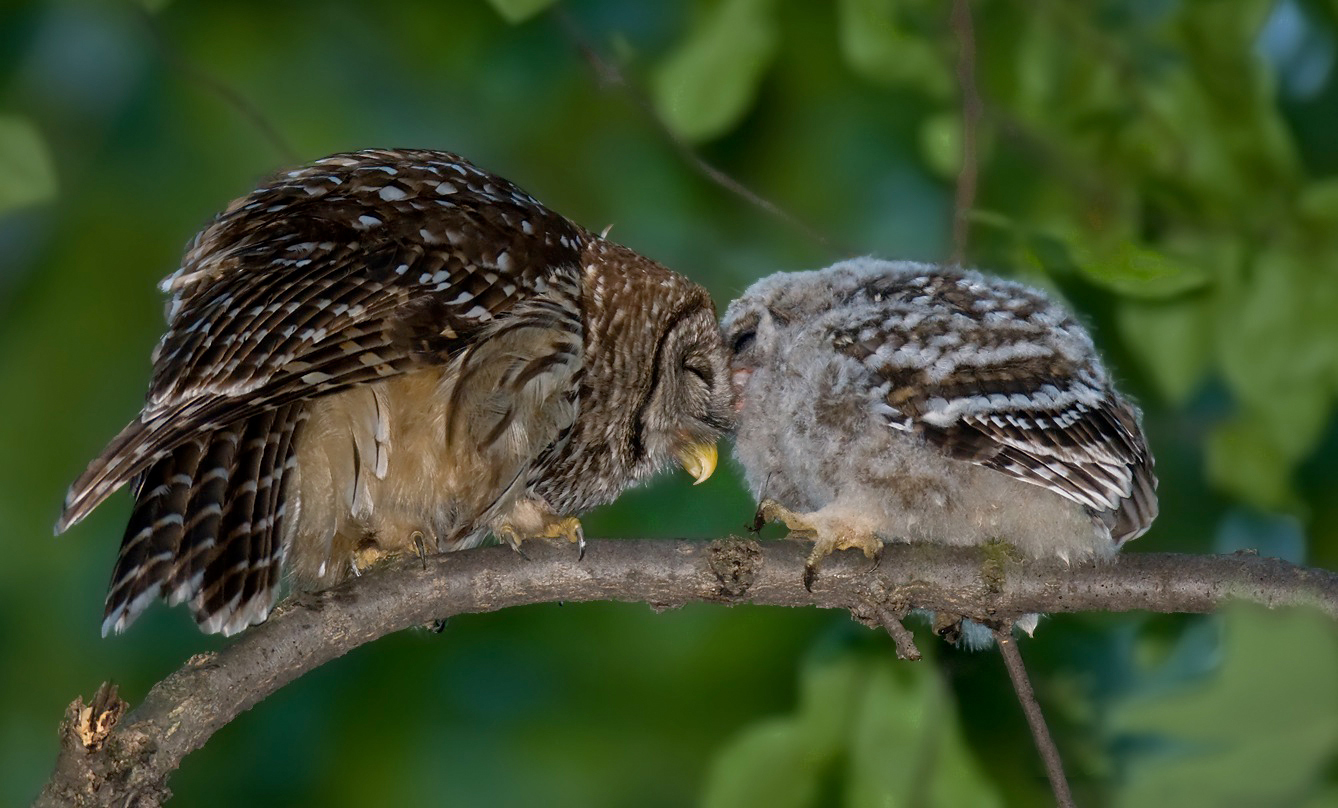
A chick nuzzles its mother after leaving its nest.

The average hatchling weighs about 46 g (1.6 oz). Like most birds, the young are initially altricial. The white down feathers that the barred owls are hatched with is replaced by white-tipped, barred-buff second down at 2 to 3 weeks of age, corresponding with growth of the wing primaries. The earlier chicks are bigger and stronger, while the latter ones may not survive if food is scarce. Size differences between barred owl nestlings may be less pronounced if the female does not begin incubation until the laying of the second egg. The larger young may fight with the younger siblings for food. The young barred owls first start moving about the nest around this 3-week point and may start to perform threat displays if scared. Adult-like feathers begin to appear at 6 weeks of age, starting at the scapulars, then radiating down across the abdomen and flanks up through the upper breast, with the last wisps of down remaining for up to 4 months. The young often start exploring around the nest tree, often falling to ground, which makes them quite vulnerable to predation despite the parents' continued protection. However, the fledglings can usually clamber back up the tree using their feet and bills, constantly wing-flapping.

Fledging occurs around 36–39 days old. After that, both parents continue to hunt for the young, but prey deliveries taper off as the young begin to make their first flights and practice hunting. Short flights are typical when the young barred owls are around 10 weeks old, with longer flights commencing around 14 weeks. By the time they are flying and hunting somewhat assuredly in early to mid-autumn, the young move away and gain independence. Dispersal of five young from Nova Scotia was 0.8 to 64 km (0.50 to 39.77 mi) away from their nests of origin. Furthermore, a recovered 6-month-old was 8 km (5.0 mi) away from its nest of origin, while five encountered as adults were found at a distance of 16 to 43 km (9.9 to 26.7 mi) from the nests where they hatched. An exceptional dispersal distance from Nova Scotia was 1,600 km (990 mi) away to Stoney Creek, Ontario. The postdispersal stage is one of great mortality causes among young owls. Usually, juvenile owls are considered "floaters", often hovering around the perimeter of fiercely defended territories for some time. In some areas, floaters may make use of nest boxes more readily than mature birds. Yearlings have been known to breed only very rarely, otherwise barred owls usually first breed when they are around 2 (sometimes 3) years old. Therefore, around 2 years is considered the age of maturity. The percentages of successful nests (i.e. at least one fledgling produced per attempt), per study were found to be 86% of 22 clutches in Minnesota (with a mean of 2.42 fledglings per successful attempt), 66% of 114 clutches in Michigan (with a mean of 1.97 fledglings per successful attempt), 25% of six clutches in Maryland (with a mean of one fledgling per all attempts and 1.48 per successful attempts), 69% of 48 clutches in Nova Scotia (with a mean of 0.25 fledgling per all attempts and two per successful attempt) and 50% of 12 nests in Washington. Little is known about the specific factors that dictate breeding success, but are likely to include the quality of the nesting site, the food supply in the area, the levels of disturbance from outside actors (usually humans), and the maturity of the pair.

== Longevity and parasitism ==
The barred owl is a naturally long-lived bird. Some record lifespans recorded per banding studies in the wild are 18 years 2 months (initial banding Kentucky, died in Ohio) and 24 years and 1 month in Minnesota. There are several records of breeding barred owls nesting successfully for a decade or more. The record lifespan for a barred owl in captivity, where many animals can live longer without the stresses of surviving in wild conditions, was 34 years and 1 month, with six records of captive barred owls living over 30 years. Known causes of mortality are diverse, some due to predation (largely great horned owls, for nestlings to adults, and probably raccoons, for eggs, nestlings and fledglings). Some mortality is known to occur during hunting accidents. Cases of barred owls being inadvertently killed in furbearer traps have been reported. Sometimes, deaths occurs due to the defenses of prey. One barred owl was killed by the bite of an unknown rodent that was likely defending itself. Some cases of cannibalism between adult barred owls have been reported as well. This species, like other forest owls, is vulnerable to the respiratory disease aspergillosis. Spontaneous infections of West Nile fever are also known to kill wild barred owls. Barred owls were the most regularly infected with West Nile Virus of owl species in Georgia, as about 15% of studied barred tested positive (still at a lower rate than some hawks). Cases of Avipoxvirus infection are also known in barred owls, but as with West Nile virus, the rate of mortality to viral infection is not well-known. A case of follicular thyroid cancer was found in a wild barred owl that was unable to continue to fly. Fatty liver diseases have been recorded for barred owls in captivity. Eye lesions are fairly common in barred owls, but can be survived and possibly surgically corrected.

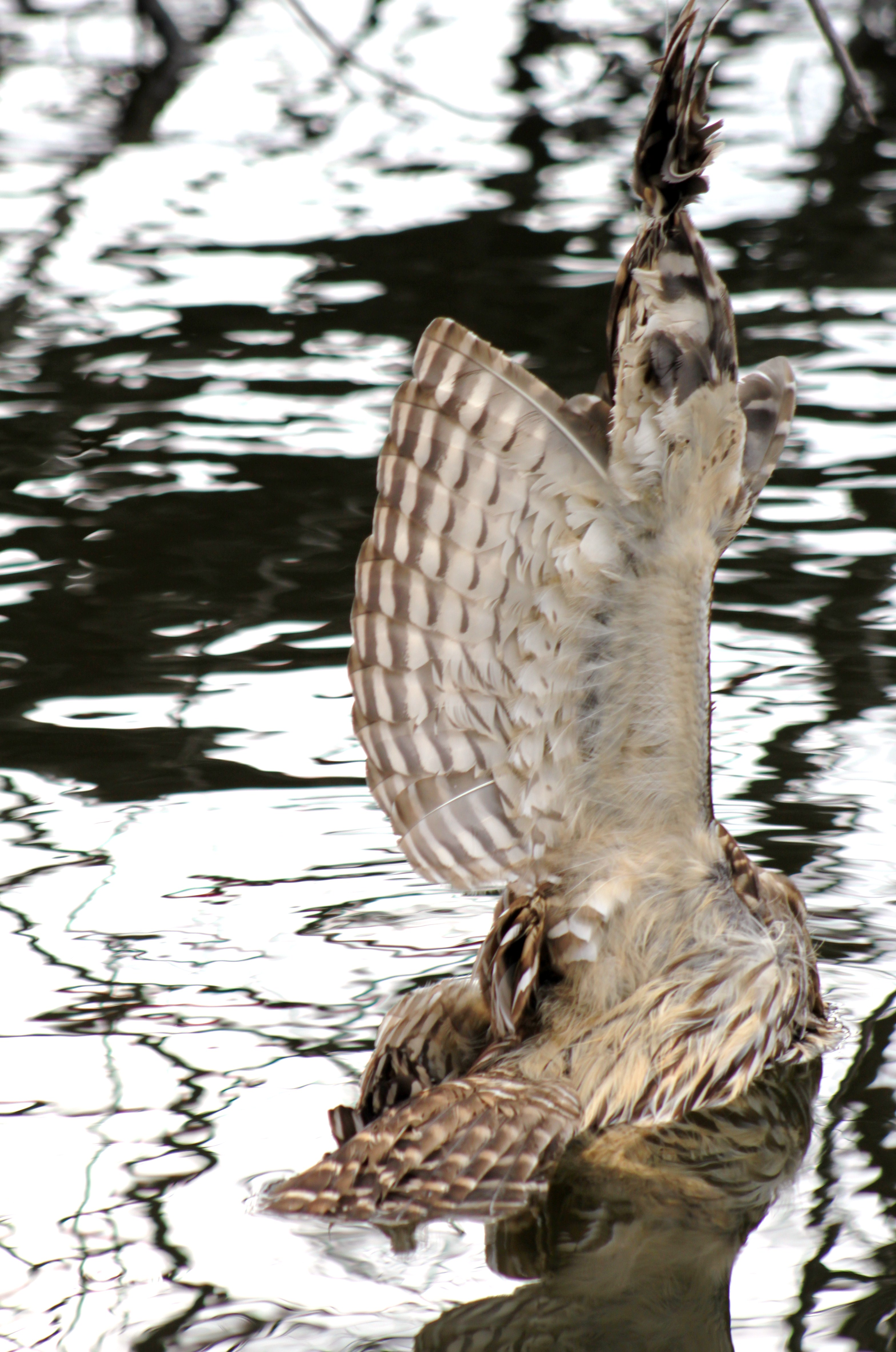
A barred owl that drowned after entanglement with fishing line

Parasitism is frequent in barred owls as expected for many different kinds of wild birds. The parasite load of helminths was determined to be higher in larger owls in Florida like the barred and great horned owl and lower in smaller owl species, like eastern screech owl. While parasitic infestations are not typically detected as direct mortality causes, in some severe cases, complications or direct death can occur. These cases of mortality are most widely recorded in cases of toxoplasmosis, although owls generally have lower rates of dangerous Toxoplasma parasites than some other species of birds of prey. Of barred owls in one study, 26.7% had Toxoplasma gondii, the cause of toxoplasmosis, upon necropsy study, with adults having it more often than immature birds. Lethal cases of trichomoniasis are also known. The effect of other parasites are more poorly known beyond generally compromising their hosts' condition, but in one case Sarcocystis strixi may have caused paralysis in a barred owl. Other parasites recorded in barred owls include Eimeria varia, Novyella, Neodiplostomum as well as apparently rare species of Centrorhynchus and Tetrameres that were first found within barred owls. Trematode flatworms such as strigeids as well as Tylodelphys and Brachylaima are found in intermediate volume in barred owls relative to other owls. Invertebrates such as hippoboscid flies and Mallophaga are known to infect barred owls as ectoparasites but seldom at severe levels. Concern was expressed that barred owls may compromise spotted owl populations with novel parasites. However, studies of Haemoproteus in barred and spotted owls in northwestern California found that native parasites were finding a new host in barred owls and may have been transmitted from spotted to barred owls but that the barred owl acted as a poor parasite host and may have diluted the parasite levels in owl populations. Furthermore, there was no evidence found that barred owls were spreading parasites to spotted owls.

== Status ==
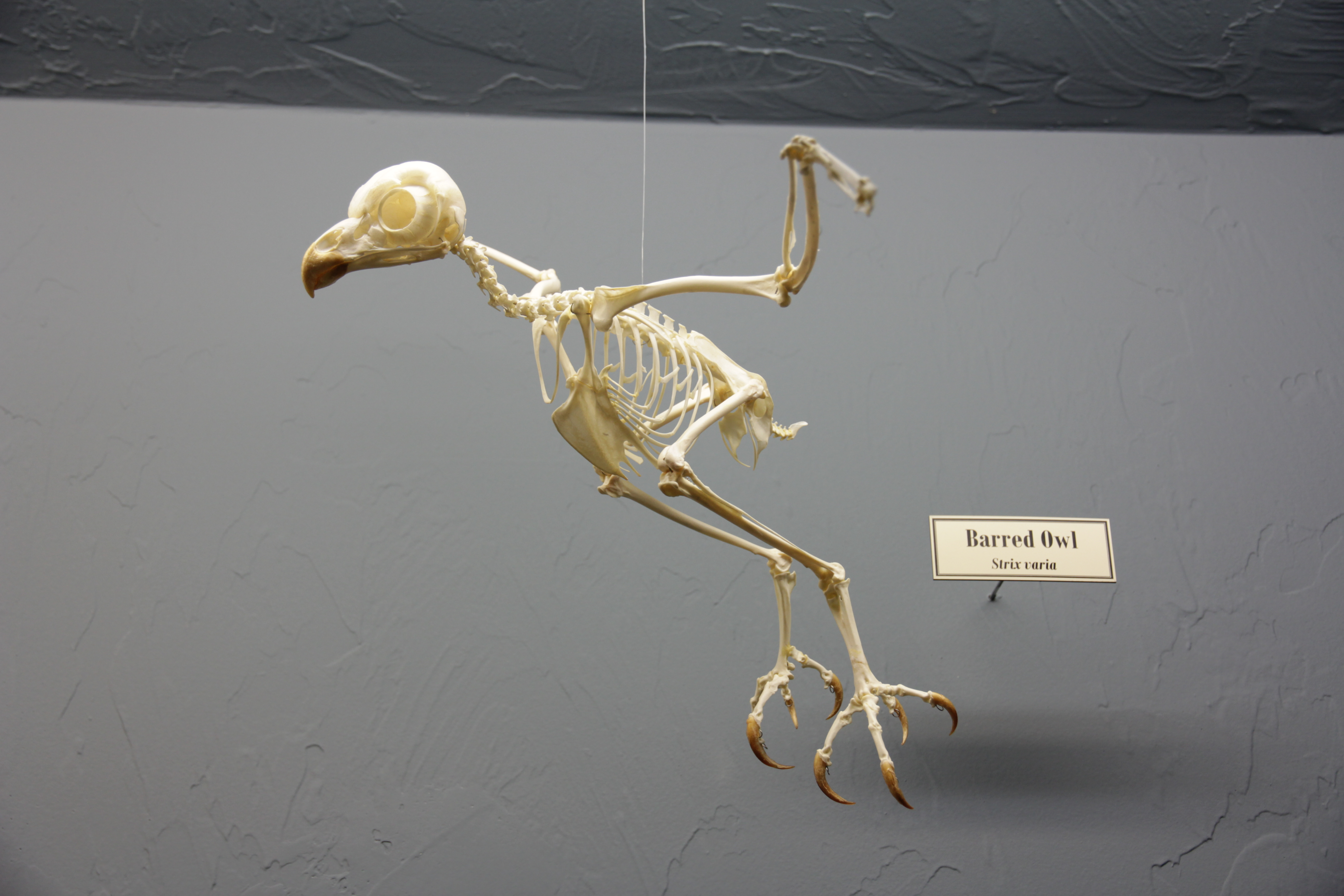
Barred owl skeleton (Museum of Osteology)

The barred owl is one of the most common owls in North America. Partners in Flight estimates that the barred owl may number up to 3 million individuals globally, making it, perhaps, the second-most-numerous North American owl behind the great horned owl and perhaps slightly ahead of other commoner species like American barn owls and northern saw-whet owls. It estimated that Canada, in total, holds about 10,000–50,000 pairs. Canadian Maritimes had highest densities known, with 3600 pairs being found in 80% of 10 km^{2} (3.9 sq mi) blocks totaling 377; this was a conspicuously higher density than that recorded in Ontario, where they were in 28% of 1824 study blocks. Iowa, Tennessee and Maryland had the highest densities of pairs apparently in the United States, being present from 39 to 47% of blocks. Throughout the year, the mean number of sightings per route is 0.12 sightings while during Christmas bird counts, the mean in 0.25 per route.

== Barred owl and northern spotted owl ==
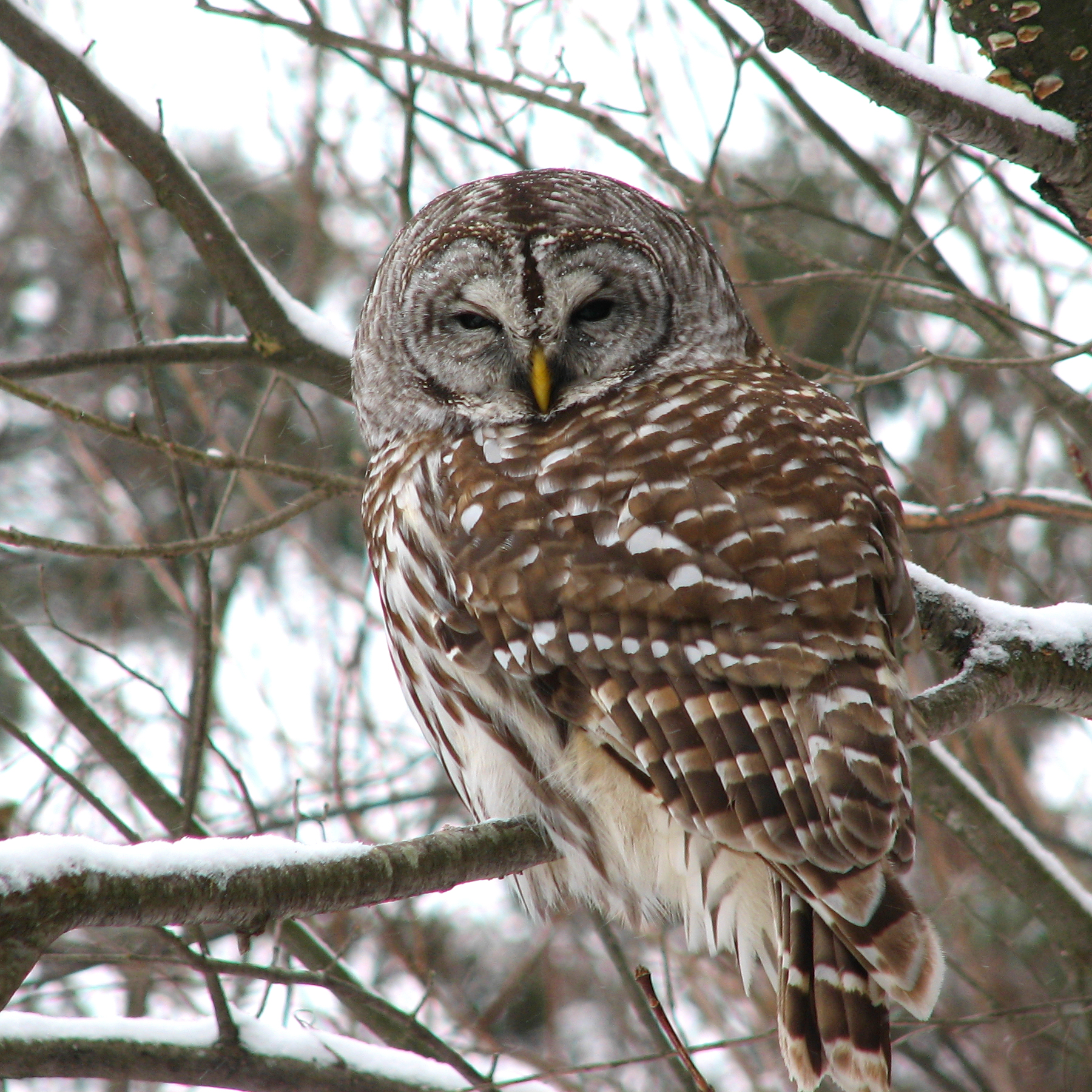
Gatineau Park, Gatineau, Quebec

Barred owls are thought to be partly responsible for the recent decline of the northern spotted owl, native to British Columbia, Washington, Oregon, and California. The 2011 Revised Recovery Plan for the Northern Spotted Owl states "Based on the best available scientific information, competition from the barred owl (S. varia) poses a significant and complex threat to the spotted owl." Northern spotted owls were thought to be already declining considerably before barred owls moved into their range, mostly in sync with large-scale logging operations and land development carried out by humans, with their problems now further exacerbated by the barred species' presence. Ecological discrepancies are seen between the species in areas of sympatry. While both species prefer old-growth forest areas, the spotted owls tend to live in significantly higher elevation areas in Washington's Cascade Mountains, with nest sites averaging 966.2 m (3,170 ft) above mean sea level against a mean of 54.1 m (177 ft) for barred owls, in areas with more steep slopes. The barred owls of the area additionally prefer wetter, more variable forest areas, down to riparian zones with limited forested land, while the spotted owls tended to cluster in more homogeneous upland and ancient coniferous forests. However, little is known on the feasibility or benefits of habitat maintenance that favors spotted over barred owls. Habitat management measures are hypothesized to be insufficient to mitigate the negative effect the barred owls are having. In areas where barred owls moved in within 0.8 km (0.50 mi) of a spotted owl nest area, 39% of spotted owls disappeared and were not seen again, while in areas still free of barred owls (so spared from this interspecific pressure), 11% of spotted owls disappeared and were not found again.

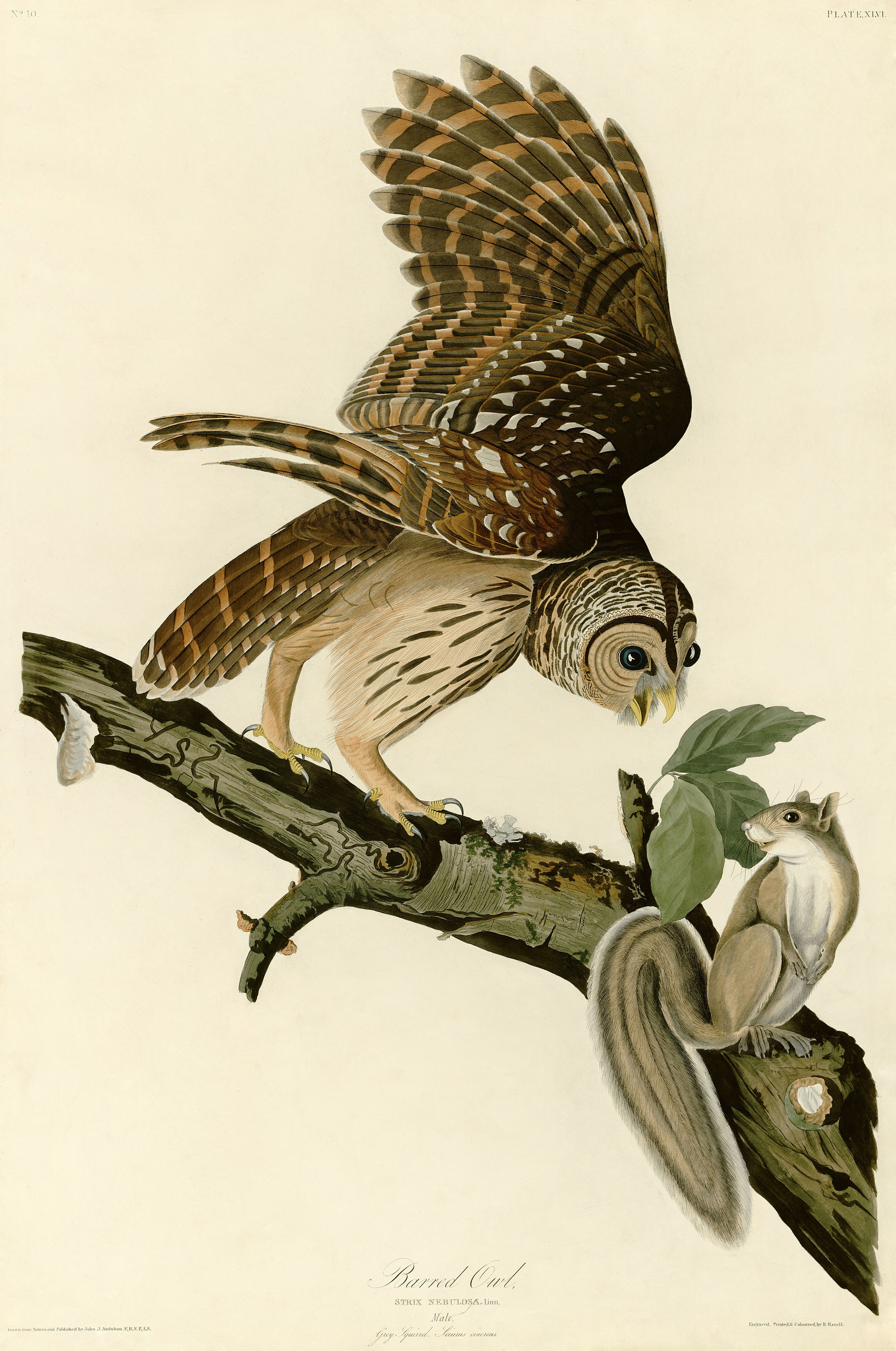
Audubon's illustration of a barred owl attacking a squirrel

Since the 1960s, barred owls have been expanding their range westward from the eastern US and Canada. While some authors have described the expansion of barred owls into the west as "natural", others state that this is a mischaracterization, as there is little to suggest that the barred owls could have reached the spotted's range without the inadvertent aid of humans — increasing temperatures, wildfire suppression, and tree planting likely facilitated the range increase. When spotted owls and barred owls share the same area, the barred owls generally are more aggressive and out-compete the spotted owls, leading to decreased populations of the native owls. The more aggressive response of barred owls to interspecific stimuli has been verified with experiments incorporating vocalization and owl dummies. Additionally, the adult survival rates appear higher for barred owls (an estimated 91%) than for spotted owls (an estimated 82%). Therefore, the barred owl is considered "demographically superior". In December 2023, the U.S. Fish and Wildlife Service issued a draft of a management plan indicating that hunters in the Pacific Northwest would be encouraged to shoot more than half a million barred owls. The rationale was to cull the numbers of this invasive species, to help protect native species, particularly the spotted owl which had been listed as threatened under the Endangered Species Act.

On October 1, 2026, the Oregon Department of State Lands began efforts to eliminate Barred Owls in the Elliott State Research Forest, becoming the first organization to start the controversial culling efforts.

Another potential threat is that barred owls and spotted owls occasionally interbreed, creating hybrids ("sparred owl" or "botted owl"). Only 47 hybrids with barred owls (all between female barred owls and male spotted owls) were found in an analysis of more than 9,000 banded spotted owls; consequently, hybridization between these two species is considered to be "an interesting biological phenomenon that is probably inconsequential compared with the real threat—direct competition between the two species for food and space". Most hybrids favor their barred owl heritage with similar and more pale overall coloring than spotted owls, though the back tends to be intermediate in color between the two and the beak coloring is variable. However, there has been much variation described. Due to variances in appearance, previously hybrids between the species were overestimated from field identification, only being certainly identified by genetic loci. Moreover, no recent hybrids could be detected in a survey of the Cascade Mountains.

== In art ==
John James Audubon illustrated the barred owl in Birds of America (published in London, 1827–1838) as Plate 46, where it is shown threatening a grey squirrel. The image was engraved and colored by Robert Havell's London workshops. The original aquatint by Audubon is owned by the Brooklyn Museum.
