= Subnivean climate =

Environment between fallen snow and terrain

The subnivean climate (From Latin for "under" (sub-) and "of snow" (niveus) and English -an.) is the environment between fallen snow and terrain. This is the environment of many hibernal animals, as it provides insulation and protection from predators. The subnivean climate is formed by three different types of snow metamorphosis: destructive metamorphosis, which begins when snow falls; constructive metamorphosis, the movement of water vapor to the surface of the snowpack; and melt metamorphosis, the melting/sublimation of snow to water vapor and its refreezing in the snowpack. These three types of metamorphosis transform individual snowflakes into ice crystals and create spaces under the snow where small animals can move.

== Subnivean fauna ==
Subnivean fauna includes small mammals such as mice, voles, shrews, and lemmings that must rely on winter snow cover for survival. These mammals move under the snow for protection from heat loss and some predators. In winter regions that do not have permafrost, the subnivean zone maintains a temperature of close to 32 °F (0 °C) regardless of the temperature above the snow cover, once the snow cover has reached a depth of six inches (15 cm) or more. The sinuous tunnels left by these small mammals can be seen from above when the snow melts to the final inch or so.

Some winter predators, such as foxes and large owls, can hear their prey through the snow and pounce from above. Ermine (stoats) can enter and hunt below the snowpack. Snowmobiles and ATVs can collapse the subnivean space. Skis and snow shoes are less likely to collapse subnivean space if the snowpack is deep enough.

Larger animals also use subnivean space. In the Arctic, ringed seals have closed spaces under the snow and above openings in the ice. In addition to resting and sleeping there, the female seals give birth to their pups on the ice. Female polar bears also den in snow caves to give birth to their young. Both types of dens are protected from exterior temperatures. Formation of these large spaces is from the animals' activity, not ground heat.

== Subnivean climate formation ==
=== Destructive metamorphosis ===
Destructive metamorphosis begins as the snow makes its way to the ground, often melting, refreezing, and settling. Water molecules become reordered, causing the snowflakes to become more spherical in appearance. These melting snowflakes fuse with others around them, becoming larger until all are uniform in size. While the snow is on the ground, the melting and joining of snow flakes reduces the height of snowpack by shrinking air spaces, causing the density and mechanical strength of the snowpack to increase. Freshly fallen snow with a density of 0.1 g/cm^{3} has very good insulating properties; however as time goes on, due to destructive metamorphism, the insulating property of the snowpack decreases, because the air spaces between snowflakes disappear. Snow that has been on the ground for a long period of time has an average density of 0.40 g/cm^{3} and conducts heat well; however, once a base of 50 cm of snow with a density around 0.3 g/cm^{3} has accumulated, temperatures under the snow remain relatively constant because the greater depth of snow compensates for its density. Destructive metamorphosis is a function of time, location, and weather. It occurs at a faster rate with higher temperatures, in the presence of water, under larger temperature gradients (e.g., warm days followed by cold nights), at lower elevations, and on slopes that receive large amounts of solar radiation. As time goes on, snow settles, compacting air spaces, a process expedited by the packing force of the wind.

Compaction of snow reduces the penetration of long- and short-wave radiation by reflecting more radiation off the snow. This limitation of light transmission through the snowpack decreases light availability under the snow. Only 3% of light can penetrate to a depth of 20 cm of snow when the density is 0.21 g/cm^{3}. At a depth of 40 cm, less than 0.2% of light is transmitted from the snow surface to ground below. This decrease in light transmission occurs up to the point at which critical compaction is reached. This occurs because the surface area of the ice crystal decreases and it causes less refraction and scattering of light. Once densities reach 0.5 g/cm^{3}, total surface area is reduced, which in turn reduces internal refraction and allows light to penetrate deeper into the snowpack.

=== Constructive metamorphosis ===
Constructive metamorphosis is caused by the upward movement of water vapor within the snowpack. Warmer temperatures are found closer to the ground because it receives heat from the core of the earth. Snow has a low thermal conductivity, so this heat is retained, creating a temperature gradient between the air underneath the snowpack and the air above it. Warmer air holds more water vapor. Through the process of sublimation, the newly formed water vapor travels vertically by way of diffusion from a higher concentration (next to the ground) to a lower concentration (near the snowpack surface) by traveling through the air spaces between ice crystals. When the water vapor reaches the top of the snowpack, it is subjected to much colder air, causing it to condense and refreeze, forming ice crystals at the top of the snowpack that can be seen as the layer of crust on top of the snow.

=== Melt metamorphism ===
Melt metamorphism is the deterioration of snow by melting. Melting can be stimulated by warmer ambient temperatures, rain, and fog. As snow melts, water is formed and the force of gravity pulls these molecules downward. En route to the ground, they refreeze, thickening in the middle stratum. During this refreezing process, energy is released in the form of latent heat. As more water comes down from the surface, it creates more heat and brings the entire snowpack column to near equal temperature. The firnification of the snow strengthens the snowpack, due to the bonding of grains of snow. Snow around trees and under canopies melts faster due to the reradiation of long-wave radiation. As snow gets older, particles of impurities (pine needles, soil, and leaves, for example) accrue within the snow. These darkened objects absorb more short-wave radiation, causing them to rise in temperature, also reflecting more long-wave radiation.
