= Helm Identification Guides =

Bird identification books

The Helm Identification Guides are a series of books that identify groups of birds. The series include two types of guides, those that are:

- Taxonomic, dealing with a particular family of birds on a worldwide scale—most early Helm Guides were this type, as well as many more-recent ones, although some later books deal with identification of such groups on a regional scale only (e.g., The Gulls Guide, which covers only species in Europe, Asia, and North America)
- Geographic, including all bird species in an area (e.g., The Birds of the West Indies)

Early volumes were sometimes published under the Croom Helm or Christopher Helm imprints. In addition, a parallel set of guides, very similar in design, was published by Pica Press in the 1990s (marked Pica in the list below); Pica was later absorbed into A & C Black (now part of Bloomsbury Publishing Plc), and these guides are now marketed as a single series. A completely revised version of the initial Seabirds has been published by Lynx Edicions.

Several of the books have won the British Birds Bird Book of the Year award. A list of titles in the series, in chronological order of publication, is as follows:

== Works with a taxonomic scope ==
Note: 'nW' indicates those that do not have worldwide coverage.

=== 1980s ===
- Seabirds - an identification guide by Peter Harrison (1983) ISBN 0-7470-1410-8 'obs.'
- Shorebirds - an identification guide to the waders of the world by John Marchant, A. J. Prater and Peter Hayman (1986) ISBN 0-7470-1403-5
- The Tanagers : Natural History, Distribution, and Identification by Morton L. Isler and Phyllis R. Isler (1987) ISBN 978-0-87474-552-8 'Smithsonian'
- Wildfowl - an identification guide to the ducks, geese and swans of the world by Steve Madge and Hilary Burn (1988) ISBN 0-7470-2201-1
- A Handbook to the Swallows and Martins of the World by Angela Turner, illustrated by Chris Rose (1989) ISBN 0-7136-4206-8

=== 1990–1994 ===
- Kingfishers, Bee-eaters and Rollers - A Handbook by C. Hilary Fry and Kathie Fry, illustrated by Alan Harris (1992) ISBN 0-7136-8028-8
- Finches and Sparrows by Peter Clement, illustrated by Alan Harris and John Davis (1993) ISBN 0-7136-8017-2
- Crows and Jays - A Guide to the Crows, Jays and Magpies of the World by Steve Madge, illustrated by Hilary Burn (1994) ISBN 0-7136-3999-7
- New World Warblers by Jon Curson, illustrated by David Quinn and David Beadle (1994) ISBN 0-7136-3932-6

=== 1995–1999 ===
- Woodpeckers by Hans Winkler, translated by David Christie, illustrated by David Nurney (1995) ISBN 1-873403-25-9 'Pica'
- Buntings and Sparrows - A Guide to the Buntings and North American Sparrows by Urban Olsson and Jon Curson, illustrated by Clive Byers (1995) ISBN 1-873403-19-4 'Pica'
- Terns of Europe and North America by Klaus Malling Olsen, illustrated by Hans Larsson (1995) ISBN 0-7136-4056-1 'A & C Black' 'nW'
- Swifts - A Guide to the Swifts and Treeswifts of the World by Phil Chantler, illustrated by Gerald Driessens (1995) ISBN 1-873403-31-3 'Pica'
- Tits, Nuthatches & Treecreepers by Simon Harrap, illustrated by David Quinn (1996) ISBN 0-7136-3964-4
- Munias and Mannikins by Robin L. Restall (1996) ISBN 1-873403-51-8
- Pittas, Broadbills and Asities by Frank Lambert, illustrated by Martin Woodcock (1996) ISBN 978-1-873403-24-2 'Pica'
- Warblers of Europe, Asia and North Africa by Kevin Baker (1997) ISBN 978-0-7136-3971-1 'nW'
- Skuas and Jaegers - a guide to the skuas and jaegers of the world by Klaus Malling Olsen, illustrated by Hans Larsson (1997) ISBN 1-873403-46-1 'Pica'
- Shrikes - A Guide to the Shrikes of the World, by Norbert Lefranc, illustrated by Tim Worfolk (1997) ISBN 1-873403-47-X 'Pica' 'obs.'
- Nightjars - A Guide to Nightjars and related Nightbirds by Nigel Cleere, illustrated by Dave Nurney (1998) ISBN 1-873403-48-8 'Pica'
- Parrots - A Guide to the Parrots of the World by Tony Juniper and Mike Parr, illustrated by Kim Franklin, Robin Restall, Dan Powell, David Johnston and Carl D'Silva (1998) ISBN 1-873403-40-2 'Pica'
- Rails - a guide to the rails, crakes, gallinules and coots of the world by Barry Taylor, illustrated by Ber van Perlo (1998) ISBN 0-300-07758-0 'Pica'
- Starlings and Mynas by Chris Feare and Adrian Craig, illustrated by Barry Croucher, Chris Shields and Kamol Komolphalin (1998) ISBN 0-7136-3961-X
- Owls - a Guide to the Owls of the World by Claus König & Friedhelm Weick and Jan-Hendrik Becking (1999) ISBN 1-873403-74-7 'Pica' 'obs.'
- New World Blackbirds - the Icterids by Alvaro Jaramillo and Peter Burke (1999) ISBN 0-7136-4333-1
- Tanagers by Morton L. Isler and Phyllis R. Isler (1999) ISBN 978-0-7136-5116-4 softcover (a revision of earlier issue)

=== 2000–2009 ===
- Thrushes by Peter Clement, illustrated by Ren Hathway (2000) ISBN 0-7136-3940-7
- Shrikes and Bush-shrikes by Tony Harris, illustrated by Kim Franklin (2000) ISBN 0-7136-3861-3
- Raptors of the World by James Ferguson-Lees and David Christie, illustrated by Kim Franklin, David Mead and Philip Burton (2001) ISBN 0-7136-8026-1
- Pigeons and Doves by David Gibbs, illustrated by Eustace Barnes and John Cox (2001) ISBN 1-873403-60-7
- Sylvia Warblers - identification, taxonomy and phylogeny of the genus Sylvia, by Hadoram Shirihai, Gabriel Gargallo and Andreas J. Helbig, illustrated by Alan Harris, photographic editor David Cottridge (2001) ISBN 0-7136-3984-9
- Sunbirds - A Guide to the Sunbirds, Flowerpeckers, Spiderhunters and Sugarbirds of the World by Robert A. Cheke and Clive F. Mann, illustrated by Richard Allen (2001) ISBN 1-873403-80-1
- Wrens, Dippers and Thrashers by David Brewer, illustrated by Barry Kent MacKay (2001) ISBN 1-873403-95-X
- Stonechats - A Guide to the Genus Saxicola by Ewan Urquhart, illustrated by Adam Bowley (2002) ISBN 0-7136-6024-4
- Pheasants, Partridges and Grouse - a guide to the Pheasants, Partridges, Quails, Grouse, Guineafowl, Buttonquails and Sandgrouse of the World by Steve Madge and Phil MacGowan (2002) ISBN 0-7136-3966-0
- Pipits and Wagtails of Europe, Asia and North America, by Per Alstrom & Krister Mild, illustrated by Bill Zetterstrom (2003) ISBN 0-7136-5834-7 'nW'
- Gulls of Europe, Asia and North America by Klaus Malling Olsen, illustrated by Hans Larsson (2003) ISBN 0-7136-7087-8 'nW'
- Owls of the World by Claus König & Friedhelm Weick (2008) ISBN 978-0-300-14227-3

=== 2010–2019 ===
- Reed and Bush Warblers by Peter Kennerley and David Pearson, illustrated by Brian Small (2010) ISBN 9780713660227
- Cotingas and Manakins by Graeme Green and Guy Kirwan (2011) ISBN 9780713660258
- Cuckoos of the World by Johannes Erritzøe, Clive F. Mann, Frederik P. Brammer and Richard A. Fuller, illustrated by Richard Allen, Jan Wilczur, Martin Woodcock and Tim Worfolk (2012) ISBN 9780713660340
- Robins and Chats by Peter Clement, and Chris Rose (2015) ISBN 9780713639636
- Wildfowl of Europe, Asia and North America by Sébastien Reeber (2015) ISBN 9781472912343 'nW'
- Flight Identification of Raptors of Europe, North Africa and the Middle East by Dick Forsman (2016) ISBN 9781472913616 'nW'
- Antpittas and Gnateaters by Harold F. Greeney and David Beadle (2018) ISBN 9781472919649
- African Raptors by William S. Clark and Rob Davies (2018) ISBN 9780713665383 'nW'

=== 2020–current ===
- Birds of Paradise and Bowerbirds by Phil Gregory and Richard Allen (2020) ISBN 9780713660272
- Seabirds: The New Identification Guide by Peter Harrison, Martin Perrow, and Hans Larsson (2021) ISBN 978-8416728411 'Lynx'
- Shrikes of the World by Norbert Lefranc (2022) ISBN 9781472933775
