= Greeney =

Greeney is a surname. Notable people with the surname include:

- Harold F. Greeney (born 1972), American biologist
- Norm Greeney (1910–1985), American football player

== See also ==
- Greaney
- Greany
- Greenie (disambiguation)
