= Forssman =

Surname list

Forssman is the surname of the following people

- Darren Forssman (born in 1970), Australian rules footballer
- John Forssman (1868–1947), Swedish pathologist and bacteriologist
- Sven Forssman (1882–1919), Swedish gymnast

== See also ==
- Börjeson–Forssman–Lehmann syndrome, rare genetic disease
- Siemens-Schuckert Forssman, bomber aircraft prototype
- Werner Forssmann (1904–1979), German physician, Nobel Prize in Medicine
- Forsman
