= Greaney =

Greaney is a surname of Irish origin. Notable people with the name include:

- Áine Greaney (born c. 1962), Irish writer and editor
- Alex Greaney (born 1975), British rowing cox
- Con Greaney (1912–2001), Irish singer
- Dan Greaney (born 1964), American television writer and presidential candidate
- Edmond Greaney (1893–1923), farmer and IRA soldier
- John Greaney (born 1939), American judge
- Mark Greaney (born 1980), Irish musician
- Mark Greaney (novelist) (born 1967), American novelist
- Susan Greaney, British archaeologist
- Tom Greaney (1909–1999), Irish hurler

== See also ==
- Greany
- Greeney
- Greenie (disambiguation)
