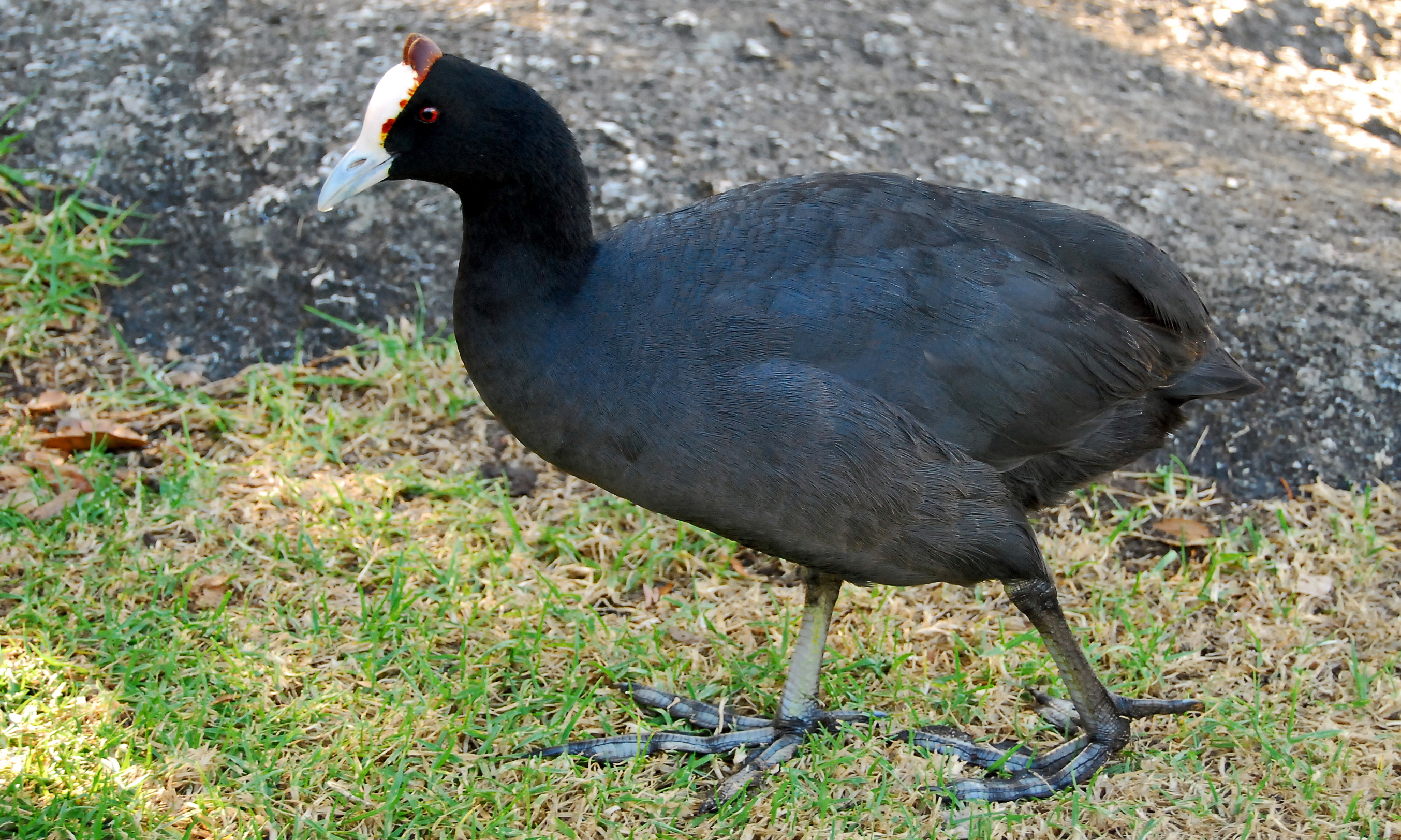

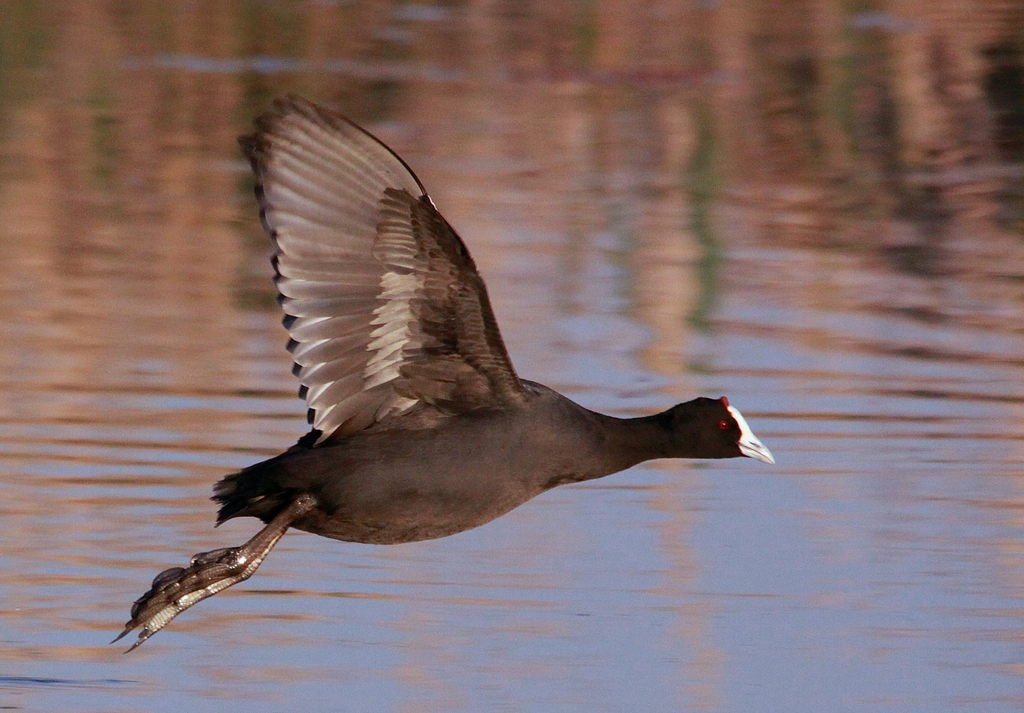
- Adult birds in South Africa

Conservation status
- Least Concern (IUCN 3.1)

Scientific classification
- Kingdom: Animalia
- Phylum: Chordata
- Class: Aves
- Order: Gruiformes
- Family: Rallidae
- Genus: Fulica
- Species: F. cristata

Binomial name
- Fulica cristata Gmelin, JF, 1789

= Red-knobbed coot =

Species of bird

The red-knobbed coot or crested coot (Fulica cristata) is a member of the rail and crake bird family, the Rallidae.

It is a resident breeder across much of Africa and in southernmost Spain on freshwater lakes and ponds. It builds a nest of dead reeds near the water's edge or more commonly afloat, laying about 7 eggs (or more in good conditions).

== Taxonomy ==
The red-knobbed coot was formally described in 1789 by the German naturalist Johann Friedrich Gmelin in his revised and expanded edition of Carl Linnaeus's Systema Naturae. He placed it with all the other coots in the genus Fulica and coined the binomial name Fulica cristata. Gmelin based his account on the earlier descriptions by the French naturalist Georges-Louis Leclerc, Comte de Buffon and the English ornithologist John Latham, neither of whom had included a binomial name. They gave the type locality as Madagascar. The genus Fulica had been introduced in 1758 by the Swedish naturalist Carl Linnaeus in the tenth edition of his Systema Naturae. The genus name is the Latin word for a Eurasian coot. The specific epithet cristata is from Latin cristatus meaning "crested" or "plumed". The species is monotypic: no subspecies are recognised.

== Description ==
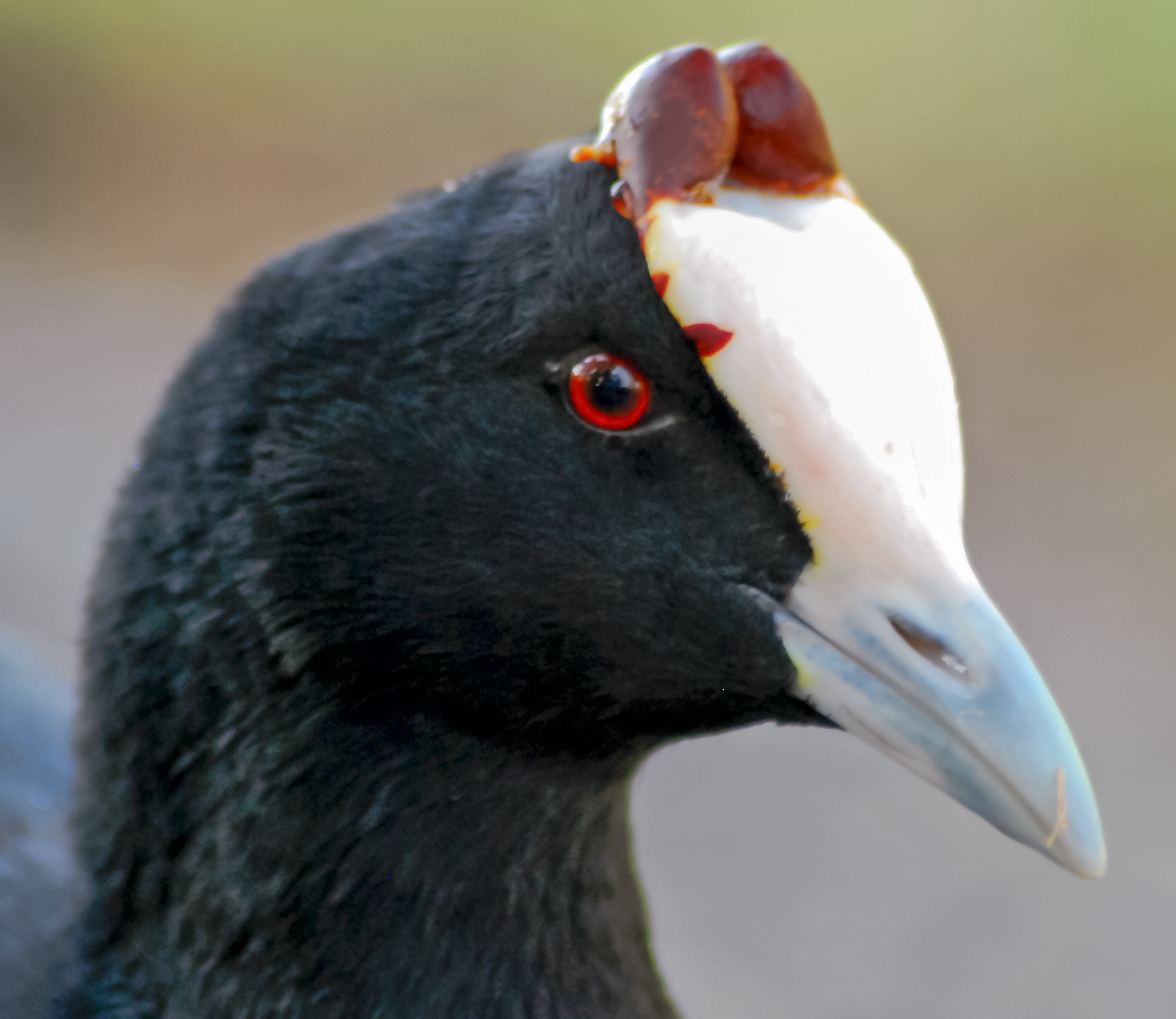
Head of a bird in breeding condition, South Africa

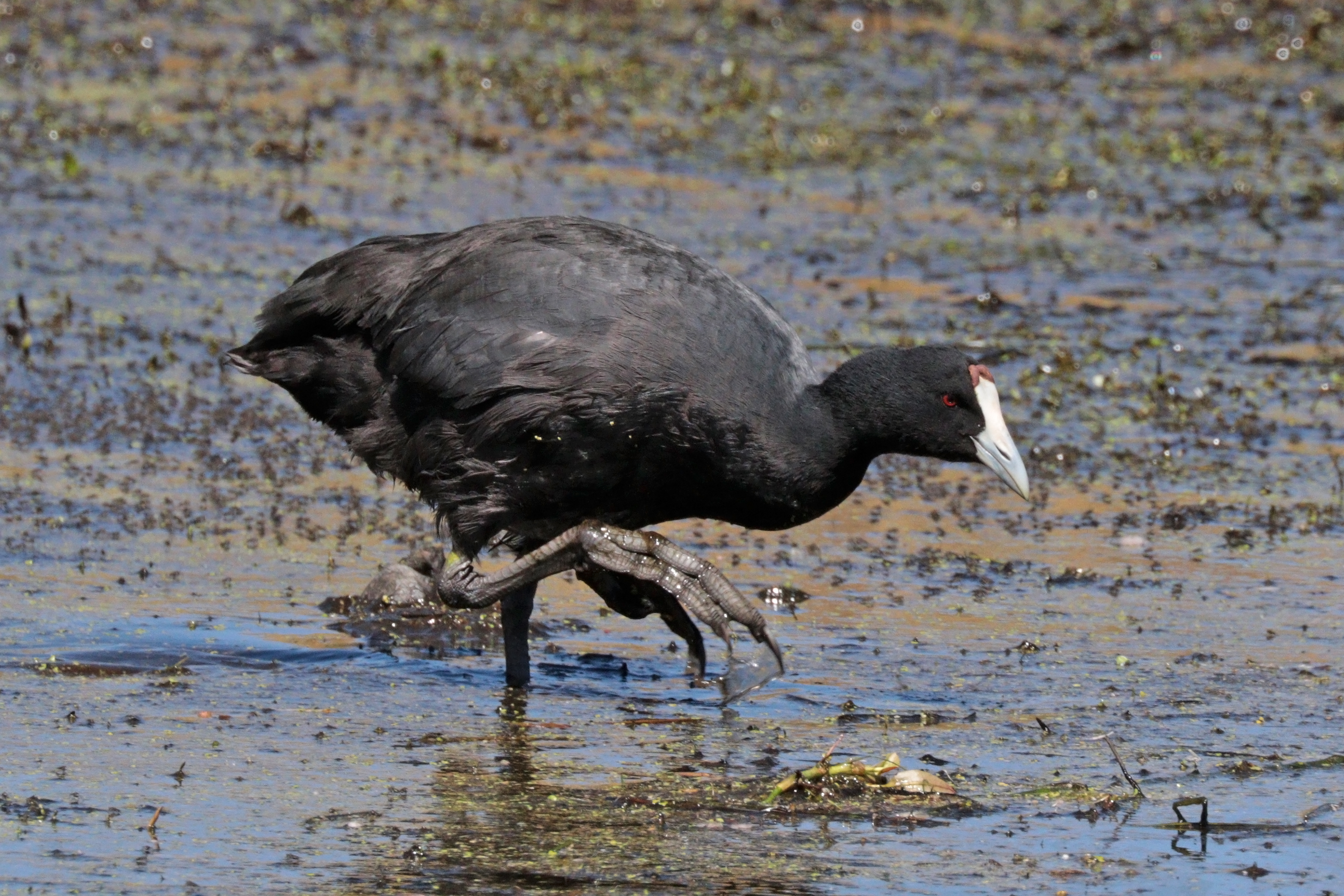
Non-breeding condition, Ethiopia

The red-knobbed coot is largely black except for the white frontal shield. It is 35–42 cm (14–17 in) long, spans 75–85 cm (30–33 in) across the wings. Males weigh 770–910 g (27–32 oz), females are slightly smaller and weigh 455–790 g (16.0–27.9 oz). The sexes are alike. As a swimming species, it has partial webbing on its long strong toes. The juvenile is paler than the adult, has a whitish breast, and lacks the facial shield; the adult's black plumage develops when about 3–4 months old, but the white shield is only fully developed at about one year old, some time later.

A good view is necessary to separate this species from the Eurasian coot, with which its range overlaps in northwestern Africa and southern Iberia. There are two tiny red knobs at the top of the facial shield, which are not visible at any great distance and are only present in the breeding season; the black feathering between the shield and the bill is rounded, whereas in Eurasian it comes to a point; and the bill has a bluish grey tinge. In flight, the red-knobbed coot lacks the white trailing edge to the secondaries of the Eurasian coot.

== Behaviour ==
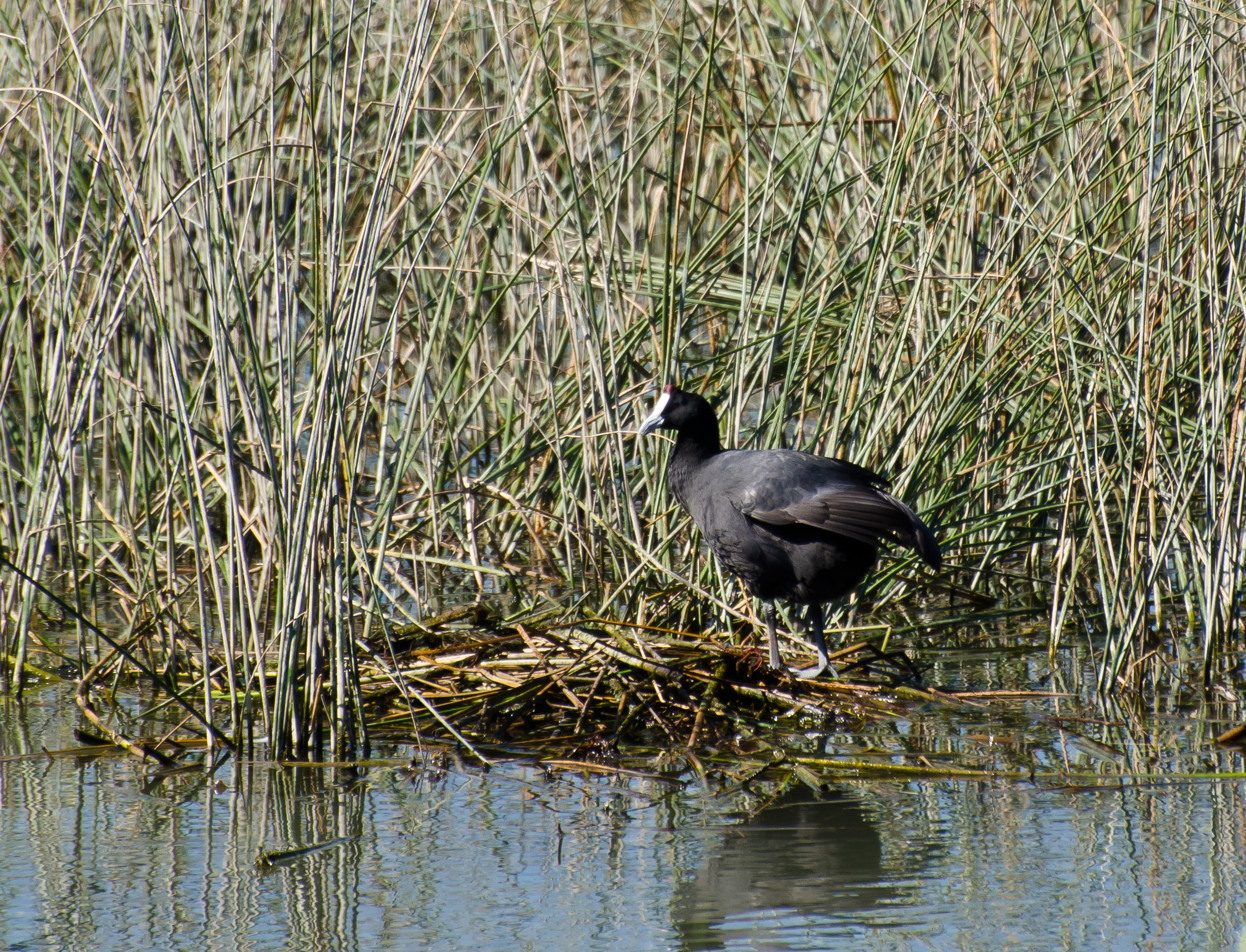
Nest on the island of Mallorca

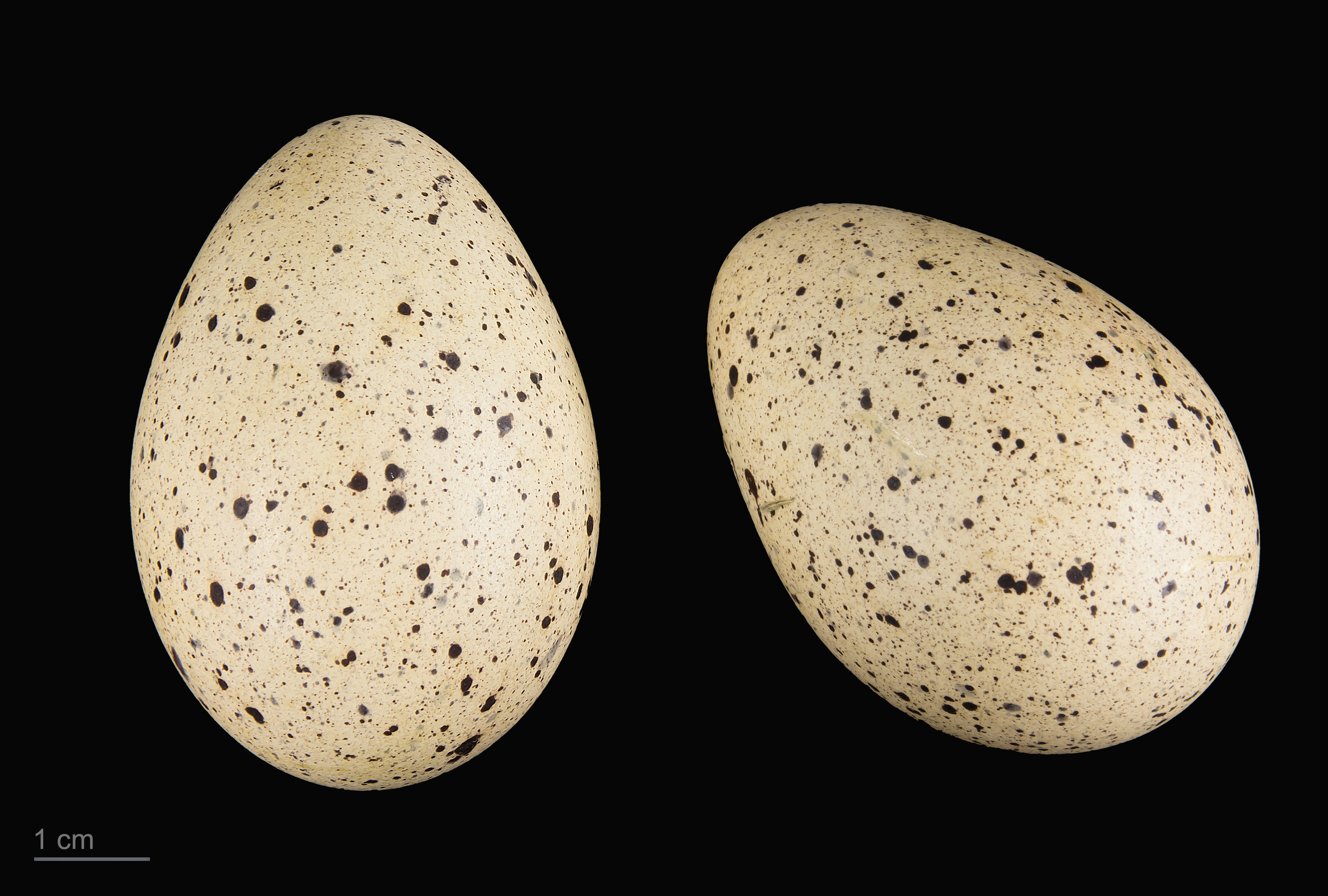
Clutch from Morocco

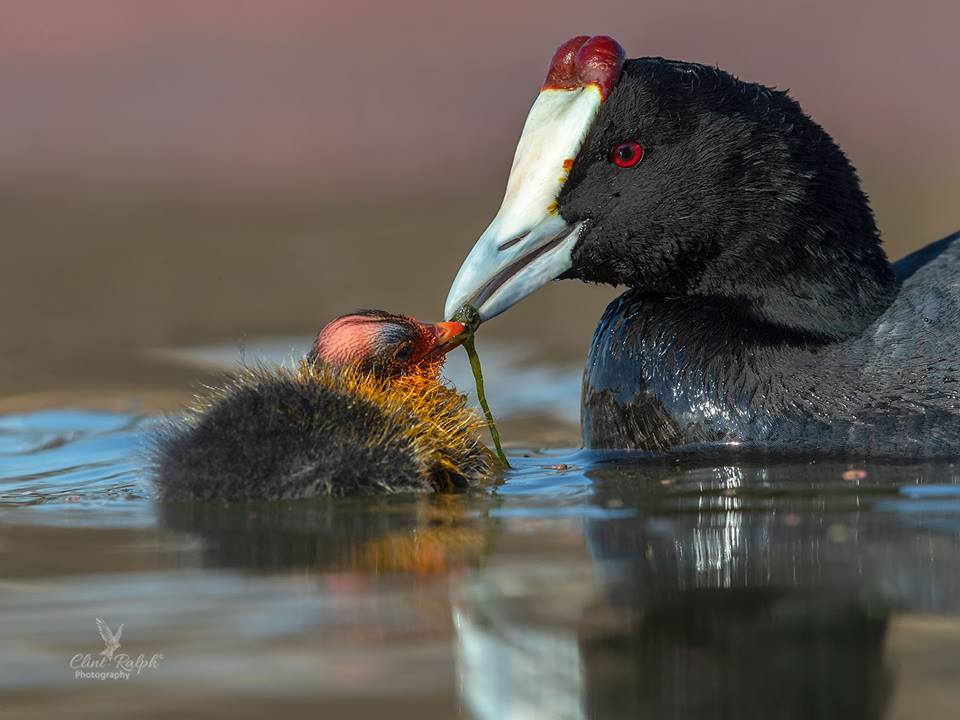
Adult feeding a chick.

The habits of the red-knobbed coot are practically identical to those of the Eurasian coot. It is much less secretive than most of the rail family. Where it is undisturbed it is likely to bully any intruder, even large birds such as Egyptian geese, if they do not defy its challenges. It can be seen swimming on open water or walking across waterside grasslands. It is an aggressive species, and strongly territorial during the breeding season.

The red-knobbed coot is reluctant to fly and when taking off runs across the water surface with much splashing. It does the same, but without actually flying, when travelling a short distance at speed (to escape a rival, for example, or to dispute possession of a choice morsel). It bobs its head as it swims, and makes short dives from a little jump.

=== Breeding ===
The nest is a bulky platform of reeds and plant stems placed in shallow water. It is built by both sexes. The clutch of 5–7 eggs are laid at daily intervals. The eggs are incubated by both sexes for 18–25 days and hatch asynchronously. The downy precocial chicks leave the nest after one day and are then fed and cared for by both parents for 55–60 days.

=== Food and feeding ===
The red-knobbed coot is an omnivore, and will take a variety of small live prey including the eggs of other water birds. Its main food in most waters however comprises various waterweeds such as species of Potamogeton for which it commonly dives.

This is a noisy bird during mating, but its vocalisations are quite different from the Eurasian coot. It gives a fast kerrre like the little crake, a harsh ka-haa and a grunting hoot "oot oot" that suggests that the name "coot" might be onomatopoeia, but inspection of the etymology of "coot" fairly decisively negates any such suggestion.

== Sources ==
- Rails by Taylor and van Perlo, ISBN 90-74345-20-4
- Forsman, Dick (1991) Aspects of identification of Crested Coot Dutch Birding 13(4): 121-25
