= David Nurney =

English bird artist (born 1959)

David Ian "Dave" Nurney (born 28 May 1959 in Edmonton, London) is an English bird artist.

== Career ==
Nurney illustrated birds from an early age. In 1981, he received his diploma in communication design (graphics and illustration) at the Epsom School of Art. Besides his work as a graphic designer, he produced identification articles and illustrations of birds which were published in Birdwatching magazine from 1990 to 2013. From 1992 to 1994, he provided the line drawings to the volumes six to eight of the Handbook of the Birds of Europe, the Middle East and North Africa by Stanley Cramp (1913-1987) and Christopher M. Perrins, which were published in The Birds of the Western Palearctic (BWP) series. In 1993 he illustrated Woodpeckers of the world by Winkler and Christie which was awarded the British Birds Magazine Best Bird book of the year; In 1998 this was followed by Nightjars of the world with Nigel Cleere and The pocket Guide to Birds of Britain and North West Europe with Chris Kightley and Steve Madge; He also contributed plates to the Birds of Armenia Project. In 1999, he illustrated a color plate with nightjars in the fifth volume of the Handbook of the Birds of the World. The same year he began working on the Birds of the East Asia by Mark Brazil (2009). In 2000 he began a long collaboration with Les Beletsky on a series of Eco-travel Guides to Brazil, Thailand and others followed by a series of illustrated Bird song anthologies. In 2005 he provided line illustrations for Birds in England by Brown and Grice. Along with long time collaborator and field trip co-leader Dominic Couzens he published a set of ten identification cards in postcard size titled ID Insights Pocket Cards: British Birds, where 131 difficult to identify British bird species are depicted. This was based on articles from Birdwatching magazine which eventually became BIRDS-ID Insights a guide for birding beginners to difficult species- published 2013.

He is heavily involved with the N.O.A. bird observatory at Holme and acts as illustrator and Photographic Editor for the annual report. He still travels widely and has visited over 20 countries in search of birds. In addition, Nurney is a trustee of the King's Church in his hometown Wisbech in Cambridgeshire, where he occasionally organized birdwatching tours.

== Works which were illustrated by Nurney (selection) ==
- Birds of Europe, the Middle East and North Africa, Vol. 6: Warblers by Stanley Cramp and Christopher M. Perrins, 1992
- Birds of Europe, the Middle East and North Africa, Vol. 7: Flycatchers to Shrikes by Stanley Cramp and Christopher M. Perrins, 1993
- Birds of Europe, the Middle East and North Africa, Vol. 8: Crows to Finches by Stanley Cramp and Christopher M. Perrins, 1994
- Woodpeckers: A Guide to the Woodpeckers, piculets and wrynecks by the World by Hans Winkler and David A. Christie, 1995
- A Field Guide to Birds of Armenia by Martin S. Adamian and Daniel Klem, Jr., 1997
- Nightjars: A guide to nightjars and related birds by Nigel Cleere, 1998
- Pocket Guide to the Birds of Britain and north-west Europe by Chris Kightley and Steve Madge, 1998
- Handbook of the Birds of the World, Vol. 5: Barn-Owls To Hummingbirds 1999
- Autumn bird migration at Beidaihe, China, 1986-1990 (Incorporating the report on China Crane Watch 1986) by Martin D. Williams, 2000
- Birds of Central Asia: Kazakhstan, Turkmenistan, Uzbekistan, Kyrgyzstan, Tajikistan, and Afghanistan by Raffael Aye and Manuel Schweizer, 2002
- Bird Songs: 250 North American birds in song by Les Beletsky, 2006
- Birds of the World by Les Beletsky, 2006
- RSPB Pocket Guide to British Birds by Simon Harrap, 2007
- Birds of East Asia - China, Taiwan, Korea, Japan, and Russia by Mark Brazil, 2009
- Rare Birds Day by Day by Steve Dudley, 2010
- A patch made in heaven: a year of birdwatching in one place by Dominic Couzens 2012
- Birds of the Indian Subcontinent - India, Pakistan, Sri Lanka, Nepal, Bhutan, Bangladesh and the Maldives by Richard Grimmett, Carol Inskipp, and Tim Inskipp 2013
- Birds: ID Insights: Identifying the More Difficult Birds of Britain by Dominic Couzens, 2013
