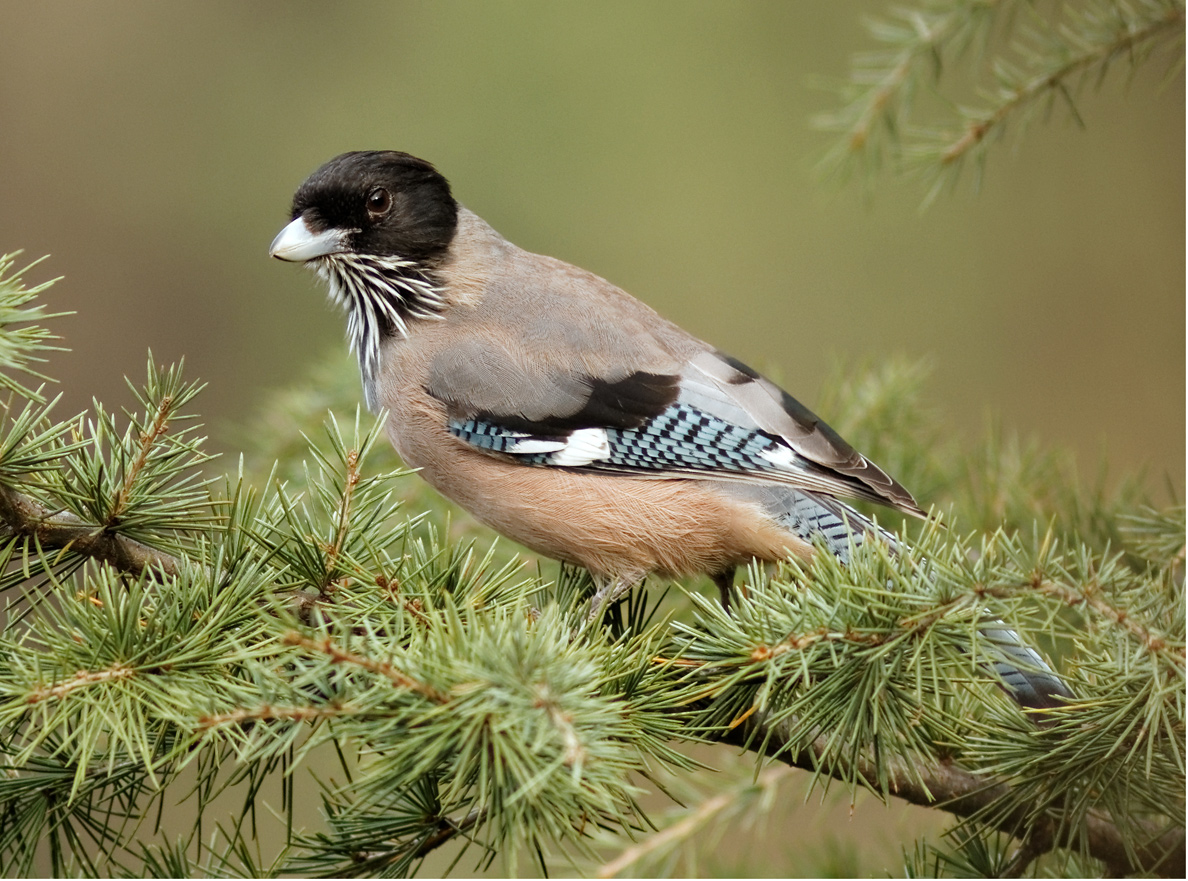
- At Palampur in Kangra Valley, Himachal Pradesh, India.

Conservation status
- Least Concern (IUCN 3.1)

Scientific classification
- Kingdom: Animalia
- Phylum: Chordata
- Class: Aves
- Order: Passeriformes
- Family: Corvidae
- Genus: Garrulus
- Species: G. lanceolatus

Binomial name
- Garrulus lanceolatus Vigors, 1830

= Black-headed jay =

Species of bird

The black-headed jay or lanceolated jay (Garrulus lanceolatus) is a species of passerine bird in the crow family Corvidae. It is found in open wooded country across the Himalayas and into eastern Afghanistan. A relatively large songbird, it has a largely grey body with a black head, an untidy crest, white streaks on the throat, and a pale bill. It is roughly the same size as its close relative the Eurasian jay, but a little more slender overall.

== Taxonomy ==
The black-headed jay was formally described by the Irish zoologist Nicholas Aylward Vigors in 1830. It is one of three species placed in the genus Garrulus that was established in 1760 by the French zoologist Mathurin Jacques Brisson. The genus name Garrulus is a Latin word meaning "chattering", "babbling" or "noisy". The specific epithet lanceolatus is Latin for "lance-shaped" or "spear-shaped", from lancea meaning "lance".

== Description ==
The black-headed jay is roughly the same size as its close relative the Eurasian jay, but a little more slender overall. The head is mostly black with white streaks on the throat and a more obvious crest compared to the Eurasian jay. The bill is pale and slightly shorter and thicker compared to its close relative. The tail is also longer. It has a very similar voice to the Eurasian jay, but with longer pauses between calls. The call is most often a harsh "kraaa", which can sound either raspy or more nasal.

== Distribution and habitat ==
Black-headed jays are non-migratory and range from eastern Afghanistan eastwards, across the Himalayas, from India to Nepal and Bhutan. They occur in wooded country with large areas of open ground rather than dense forest, and at elevations ranging from 570-4000m. They also occur in some cultivated areas and even near villages as long as there are enough trees and scrubland nearby. They may even visit agricultural land and garbage dumps to feed.

== Behavior ==
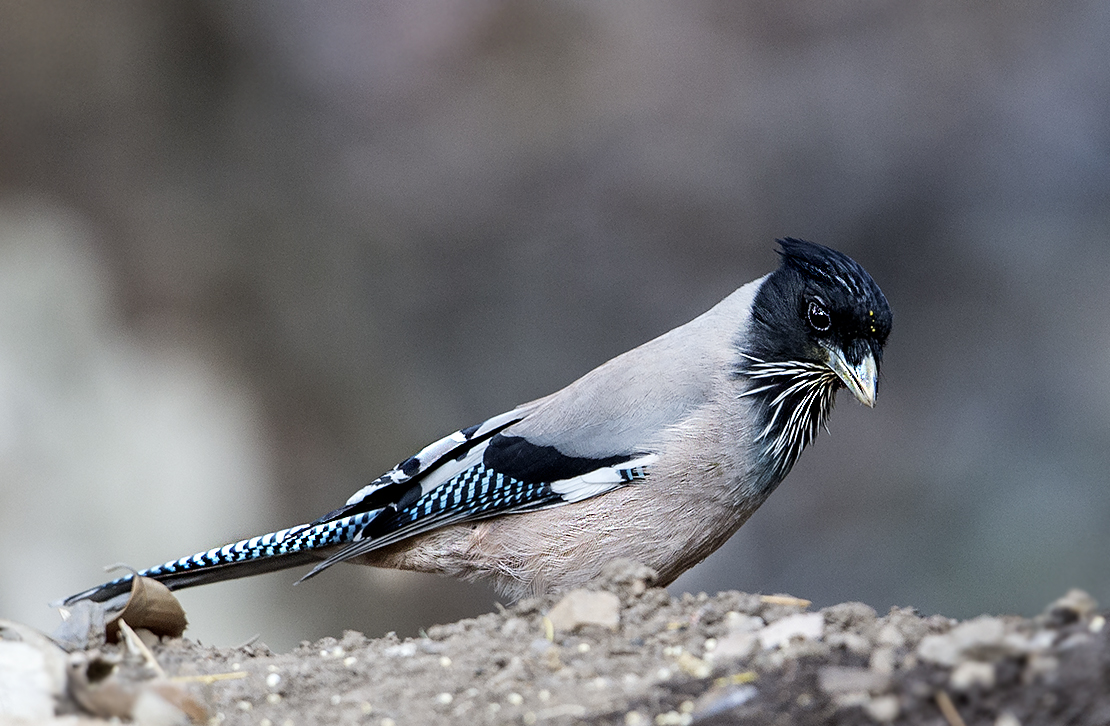
In Faridabad, Haryana, India

Black-headed jays are omnivores; they feed both on the ground and in trees, and take virtually the same wide range of plant and animal foods as the Eurasian jay, including eggs and nestlings. They can be quite bold and frequent human habitation, where they are known to feed off agricultural land and garbage dumps. They nest in trees and suitable bushes and in this resemble the Eurasian jay in every respect. Their nests are made of sticks plastered together with mud and lined with weeds and rootlets. They usually lay 3–5 eggs, which are incubated over a period of 16 days. Both parents feed the young.

== Status and conservation ==
Black-headed jays are classified as a least-concern species in the IUCN Red List, as they have a large range and are relatively common, although less so in Nepal. Though the population trend appears to be decreasing, the decline is not rapid enough to warrant an upgrade to a vulnerable species. It is suspected that the species' medium reliance on forested habitats could make it susceptible to habitat destruction in the future.

== Gallery ==
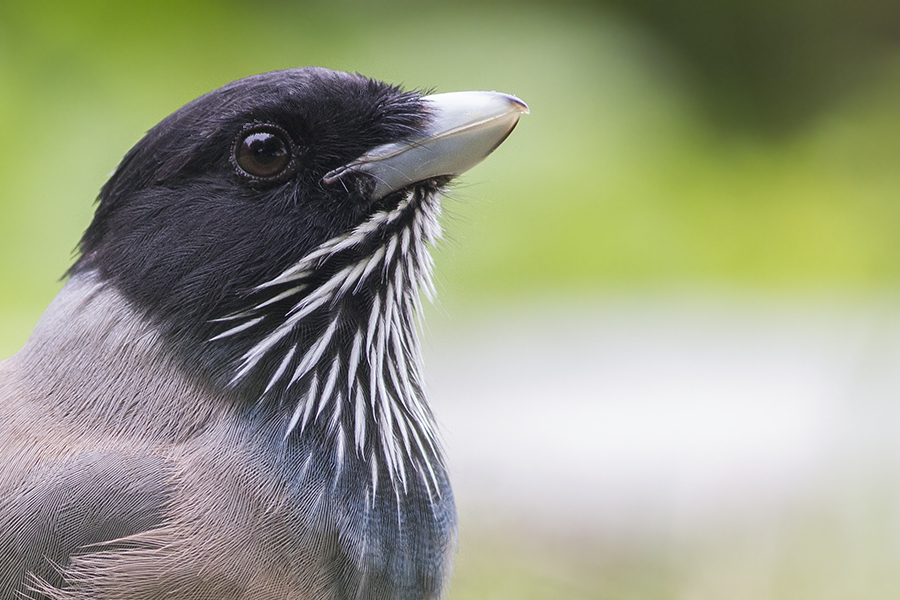
Black-headed jay at Pangot, Uttarakhand, India at an altitude of around 6300 ft.

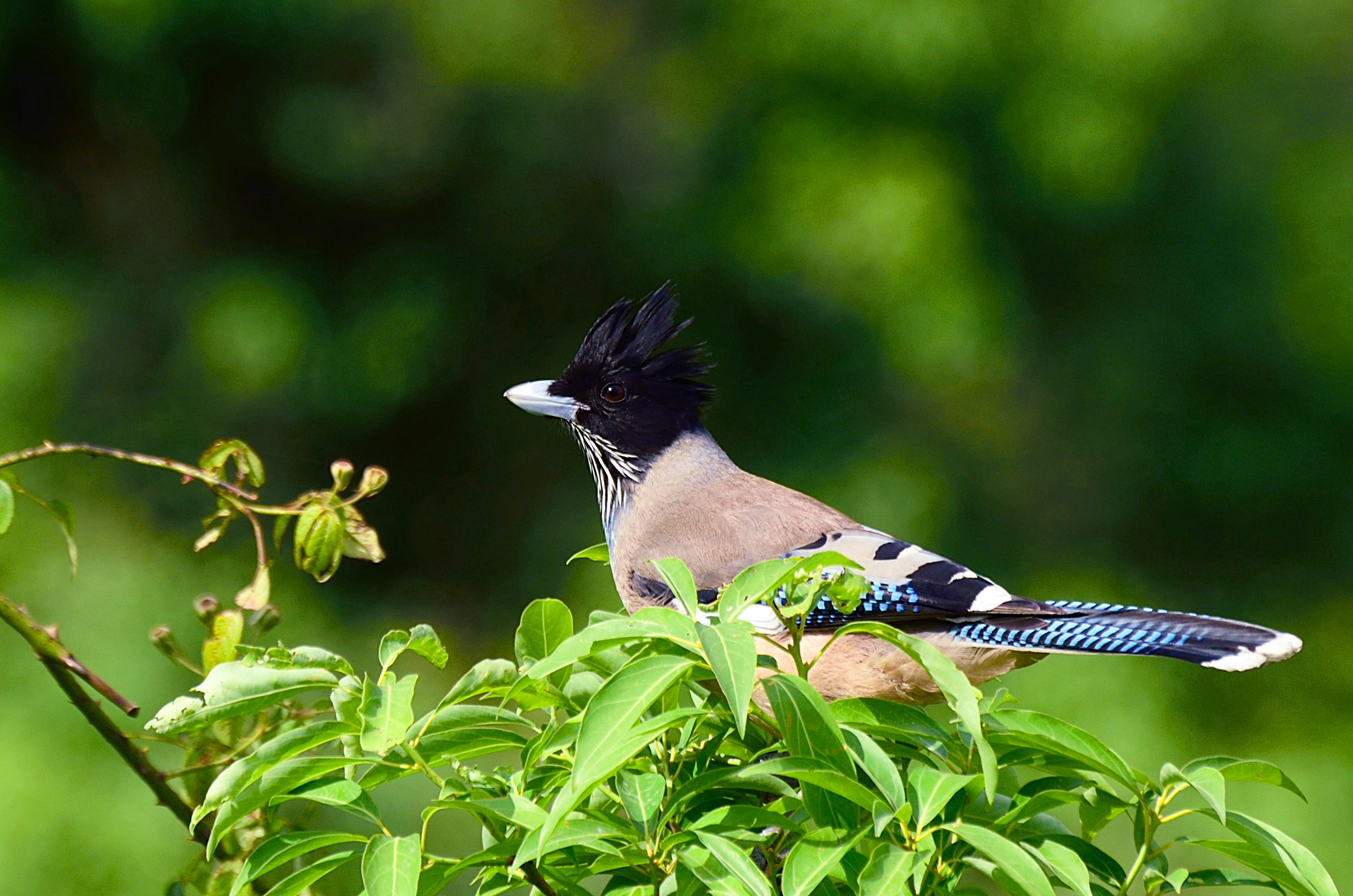
Black-headed jay near Gallu temple in Himachal

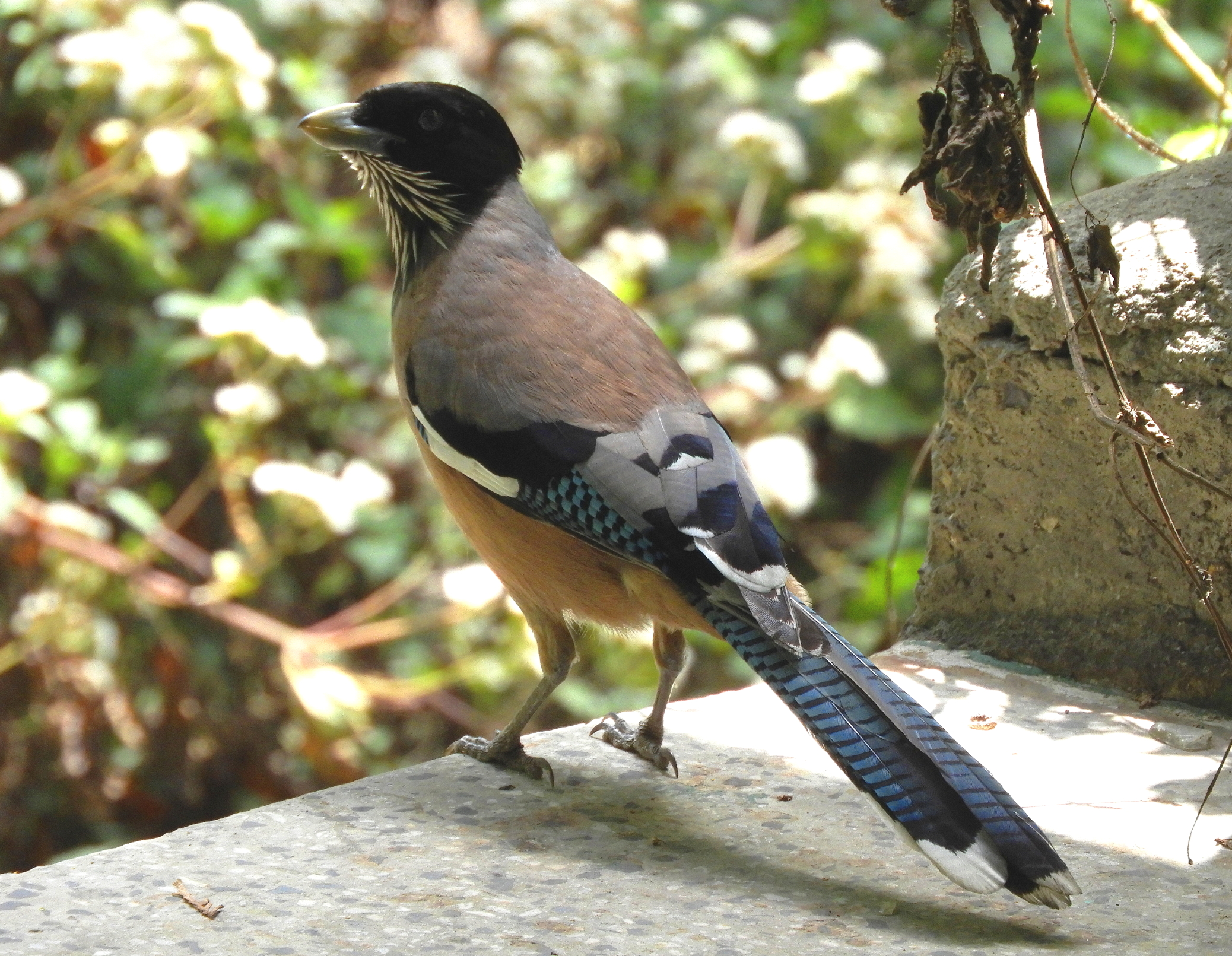
Black-headed jay at Sattal
