= Forsman =

Forsman is a surname of Scandinavian origin.

== Geographical distribution ==
As of 2014, 41.0% of all known bearers of the surname Forsman were residents of Sweden (frequency 1:2,498), 29.0% of the United States (1:129,388), 22.4% of Finland (1:2,548) and 1.9% of New Zealand (1:25,153).

In Sweden, the frequency of the surname was higher than national average (1:2,498) in the following counties:

1. Västerbotten (1:606)
2. Västernorrland (1:1,124)
3. Dalarna (1:1,260)
4. Norrbotten (1:1,327)
5. Gävleborg (1:1,556)
6. Västmanland (1:1,695)
7. Jämtland (1:2,069)
8. Uppsala (1:2,070)
9. Örebro (1:2,264)

In Finland, the frequency of the surname was higher than national average (1:2,548) in the following regions:

1. Ostrobothnia (1:547)
2. Åland (1:1,794)
3. Uusimaa (1:1,919)
4. Tavastia Proper (1:2,014)
5. Southwest Finland (1:2,030)
6. Satakunta (1:2,134)
7. Kymenlaakso (1:2,136)

== People ==
- Aarne Forsman, (1884–1921), Finnish photographer
- Andrew Forsman, American drummer
- Andrew Forsman, New Zealand racehorse trainer
- Dan Forsman, American professional golfer
- Dick Forsman, Finnish ornithologist
- Eric Forsman, American ornithologist
- Ina Forsman (born 1994), Finnish blues and blues rock singer-songwriter
- Ingela Forsman, Swedish lyricist in popular music
- Jaakko Forsman, (1839–1899) Finnish jurist and politician
- Petri Forsman, Finnish orienteering competitor
- Sairi Forsman, Mexican sculptor of Danish descent
