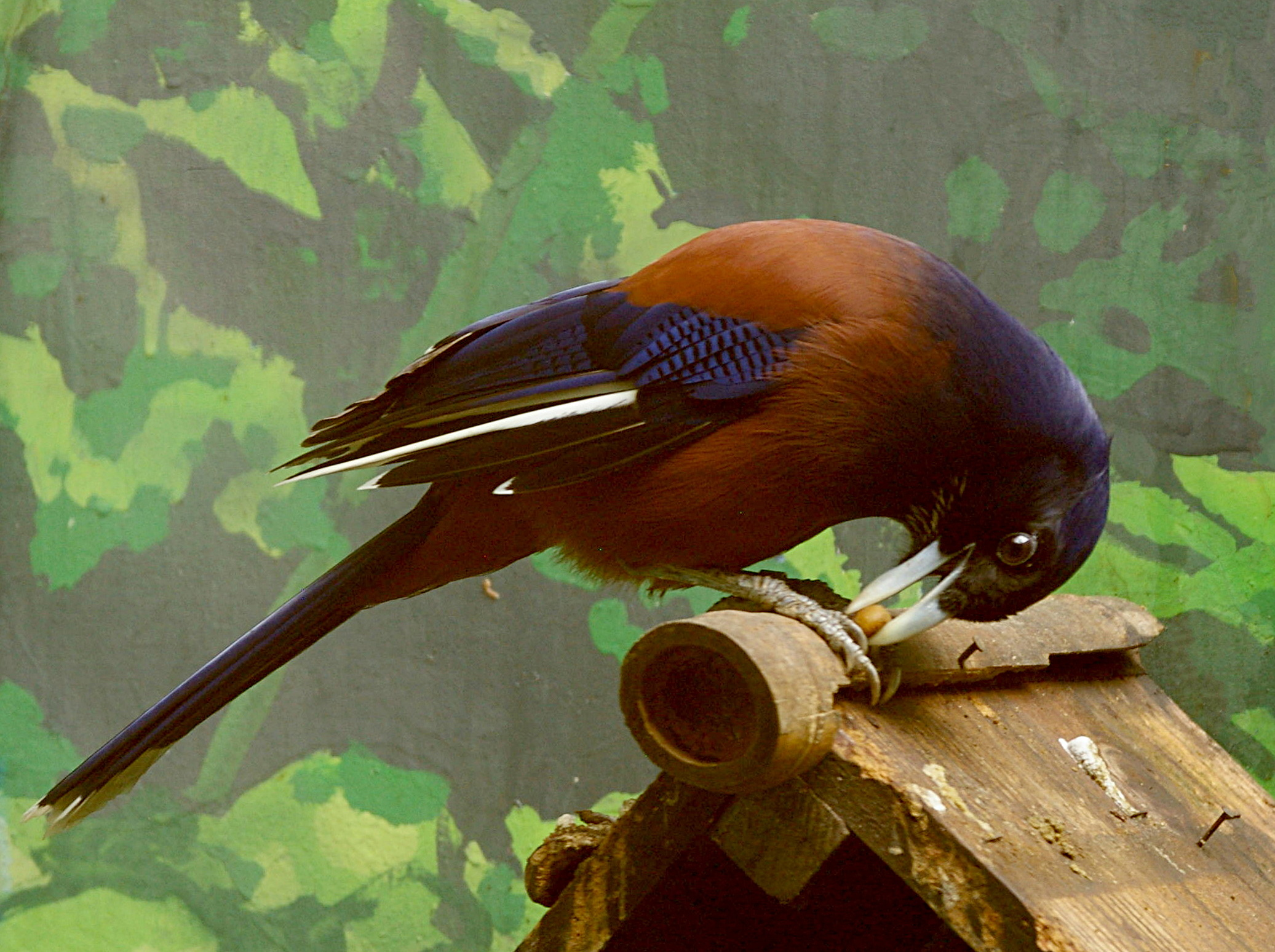
- In the Ueno Zoo, Japan

Conservation status
- Least Concern (IUCN 3.1)

Scientific classification
- Kingdom: Animalia
- Phylum: Chordata
- Class: Aves
- Order: Passeriformes
- Family: Corvidae
- Genus: Garrulus
- Species: G. lidthi

Binomial name
- Garrulus lidthi Bonaparte, 1850

= Lidth's jay =

Species of bird

Lidth's jay (Garrulus lidthi), also known as the Amami jay, is a passerine bird in the family Corvidae native to the Ryukyu Islands, Japan.

Measuring up to 38 cm (15 in) in total length, it is slightly larger than its close relative the Eurasian jay, with a proportionately stouter bill and also a longer tail. It has no discernible crest, with the head feathers a velvety black, the shoulders and back a deep purplish blue and all other parts a rich chestnut purple.

This jay has a very restricted distribution occurring only on the southern Japanese islands of Amami Ōshima and Kakeromajima. It may have also been present on Tokunoshima. It occurs in subtropical evergreen broadleaf forests as well as in coniferous, deciduous, and mixed woodlands both in the lowlands and on the mountains.

Food is largely made up of the nuts of the native chinkapin Castanopsis cuspidata but includes small reptiles and invertebrates of many types.

The bird nests in large cavities in trees but otherwise the nest is the same as that of the other two Garrulus species with 3–4 eggs.

The voice is similar to that of the Eurasian jay.

The species was threatened in the past by hunting for its feathers, which were used for decorating ladies' hats. More recently it has been threatened by introduced small Indian mongooses, which were brought to its range to control the venomous Okinawa pit viper. The species is fully protected under Japanese law and is increasing in numbers thanks to control of the mongooses, which were finally eradicated in 2024.

The species name commemorates the Dutch zoologist Theodoor Gerard van Lidth de Jeude.

In 1965 it was chosen as the symbolic bird of Kagoshima Prefecture.
