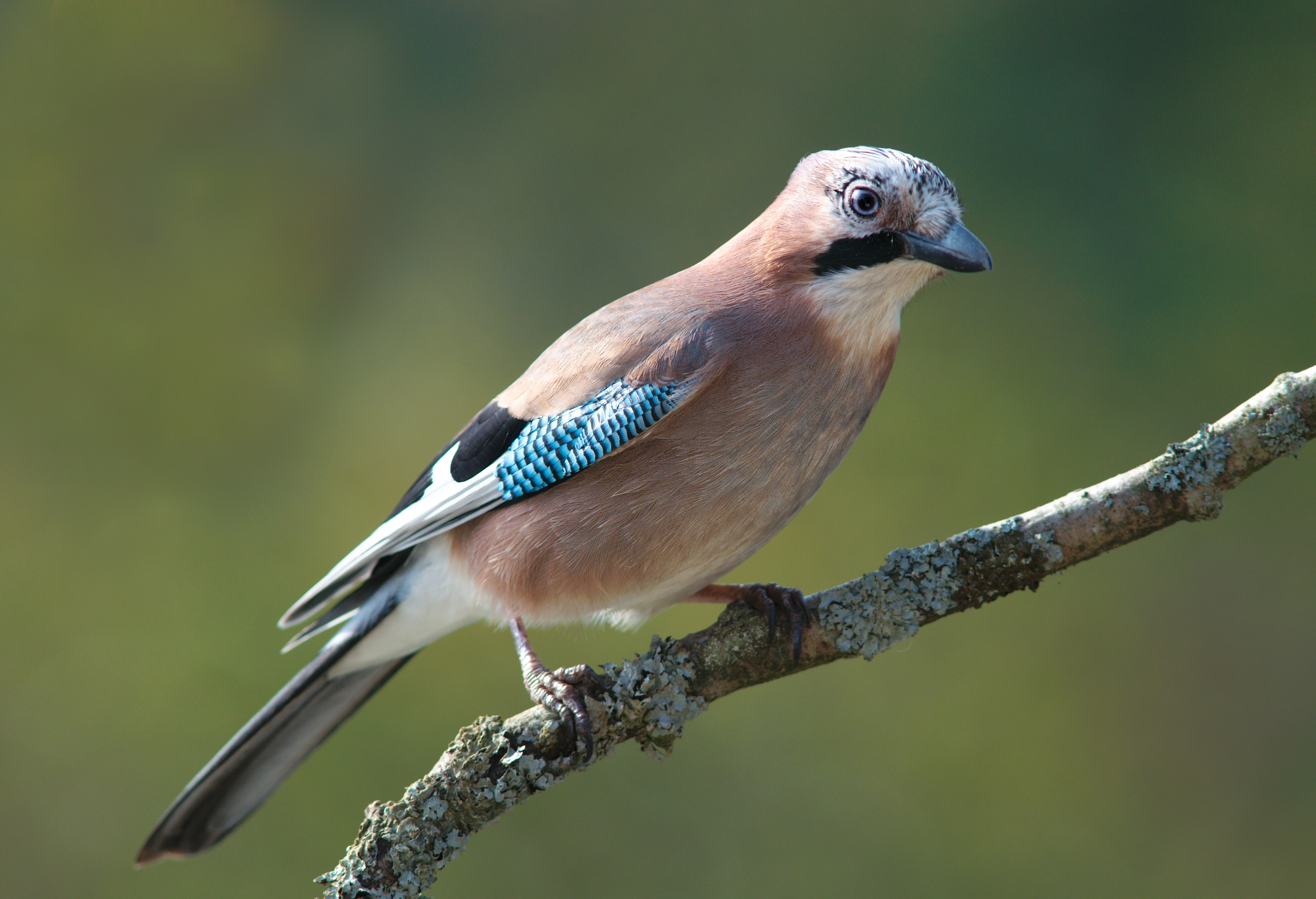
- Nominate subspecies in Belgium

Conservation status
- Least Concern (IUCN 3.1)

Scientific classification
- Kingdom: Animalia
- Phylum: Chordata
- Class: Aves
- Order: Passeriformes
- Family: Corvidae
- Genus: Garrulus
- Species: G. glandarius

Binomial name
- Garrulus glandarius (Linnaeus, 1758)

Subspecies
- 33 (in eight groups) - see text
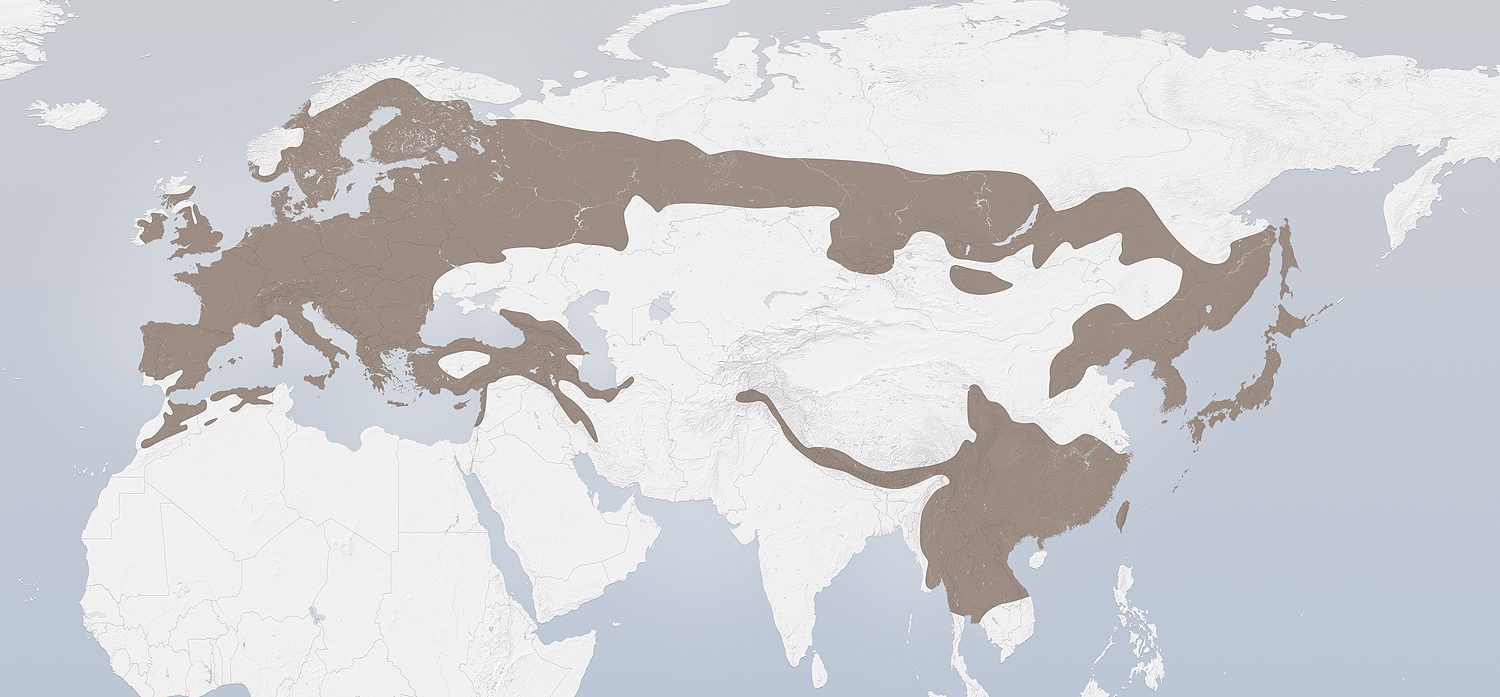
- Range

Synonyms
- Corvus glandarius Linnaeus, 1758

= Eurasian jay =

Eurasian jay Temporal range: Gelasian–present (Note: Fossil remains are known from between 1.81 and 0.78 million years ago.)

Species of bird

The Eurasian jay (Garrulus glandarius) is a species of passerine bird in the family Corvidae. It has pinkish brown plumage with a black stripe on each side of a whitish throat, a bright blue panel on the upper wing and a black tail. The Eurasian jay is a woodland bird that occurs over a vast region from western Europe and north-west Africa to the Indian subcontinent and farther to the eastern seaboard of Asia and down into south-east Asia.

Across the vast Species distribution, several distinct racial forms have evolved which look different from each other, especially when comparing forms at the extremes of its range.

== Taxonomy and systematics ==
The Eurasian jay was formally described by the Swedish naturalist Carl Linnaeus in 1758 in the tenth edition of his Systema Naturae under the binomial name Corvus glandarius. Linnaeus specified the locality as "Europa" but this was restricted to Sweden by Ernst Hartert in 1903. The Eurasian jay is now one of three species placed in the genus Garrulus that was established in 1760 by the French zoologist Mathurin Jacques Brisson. The genus name Garrulus is a Latin word meaning "chattering", "babbling" or "noisy". The specific epithet glandarius is Latin meaning "of acorns".

Eight racial groups (33 subspecies in total) were recognised by Steve Madge & Hilary Burn in 1994:

- the nominate group (nine European races), with a streaked crown.
- the cervicalis group (three races in North Africa), with a rufous nape, grey mantle, very pale head sides, and a streaked or black crown.
- the atricapillus group (four races in Middle East, Crimea & Turkey), with a uniform mantle & nape, black crown and very pale face.
- the race hyrcanus (Caspian Hyrcanian mixed forests of Iran), small with black forecrown and broadly streaked hindcrown.
- the brandtii group (four races in Siberia and northern Japan), with a streaked crown, reddish head, dark iris and grey mantle.
- the leucotis group (two races in south-east Asia), with no white in the wing, a white forecrown, black hindcrown and much white on the sides of the head.
- the bispecularis group (six races in the Himalayan region), with an unstreaked rufous crown, and no white wing-patch.
- the japonicus group (four races in the southern Japanese islands), with a large white wing-patch, blackish face and scaled crown.

The International Union for Conservation of Nature (IUCN) and Birdlife International split the Eurasian jay into three species. The subspecies G. g. leucotis becomes the white-face jay (Garrulus leucotis) and the bispecularis group containing six subspecies becomes the plain-crowned jay (Garrulus bispecularis).

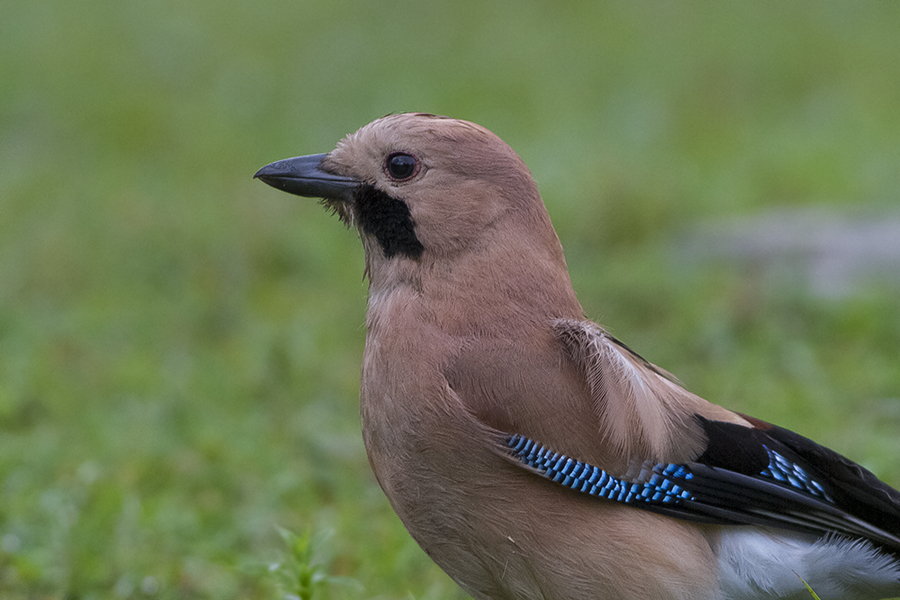
G. g. bispecularis
Uttarakhand, India

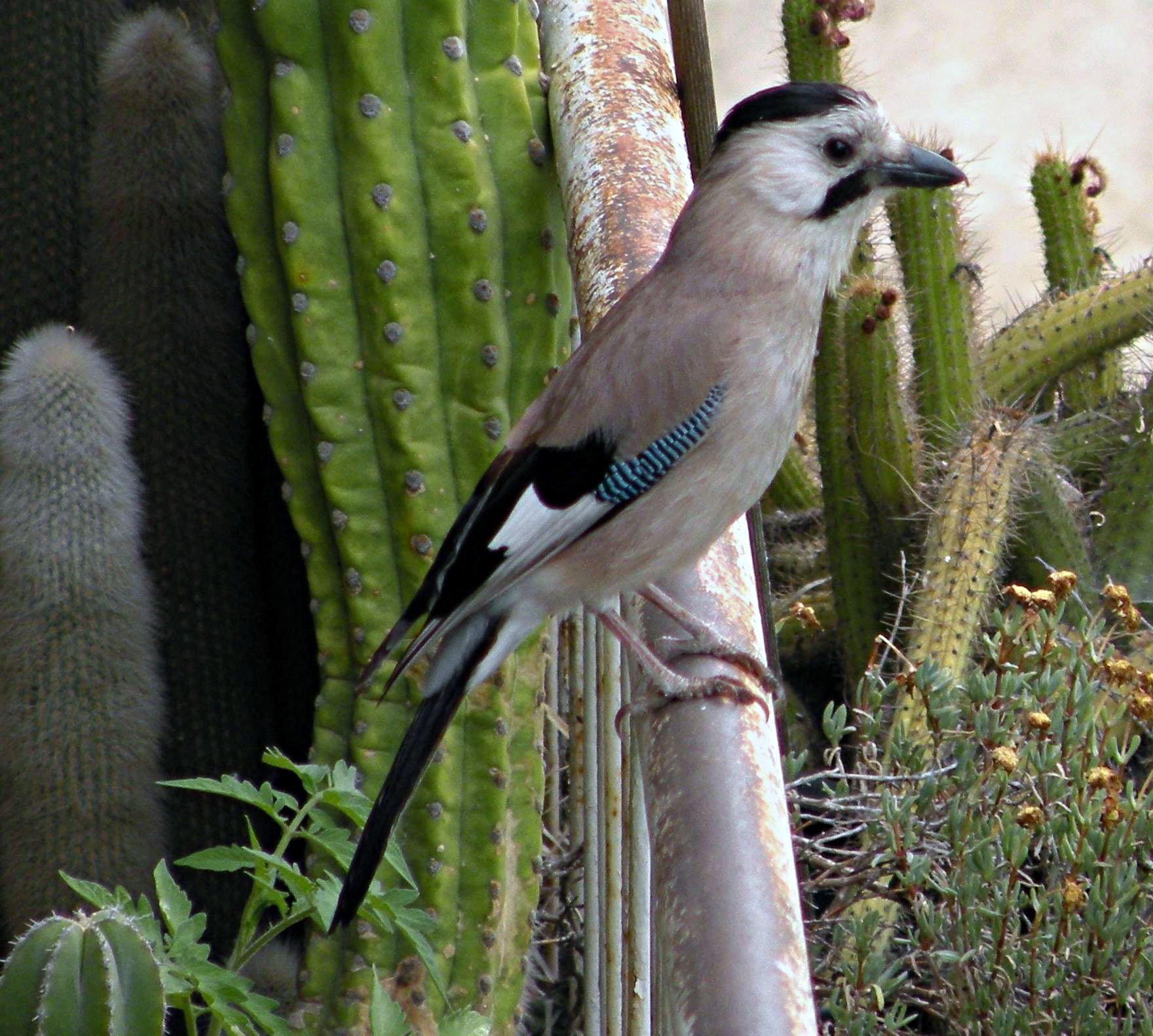
G. g. atricapillus
Jerusalem, Israel

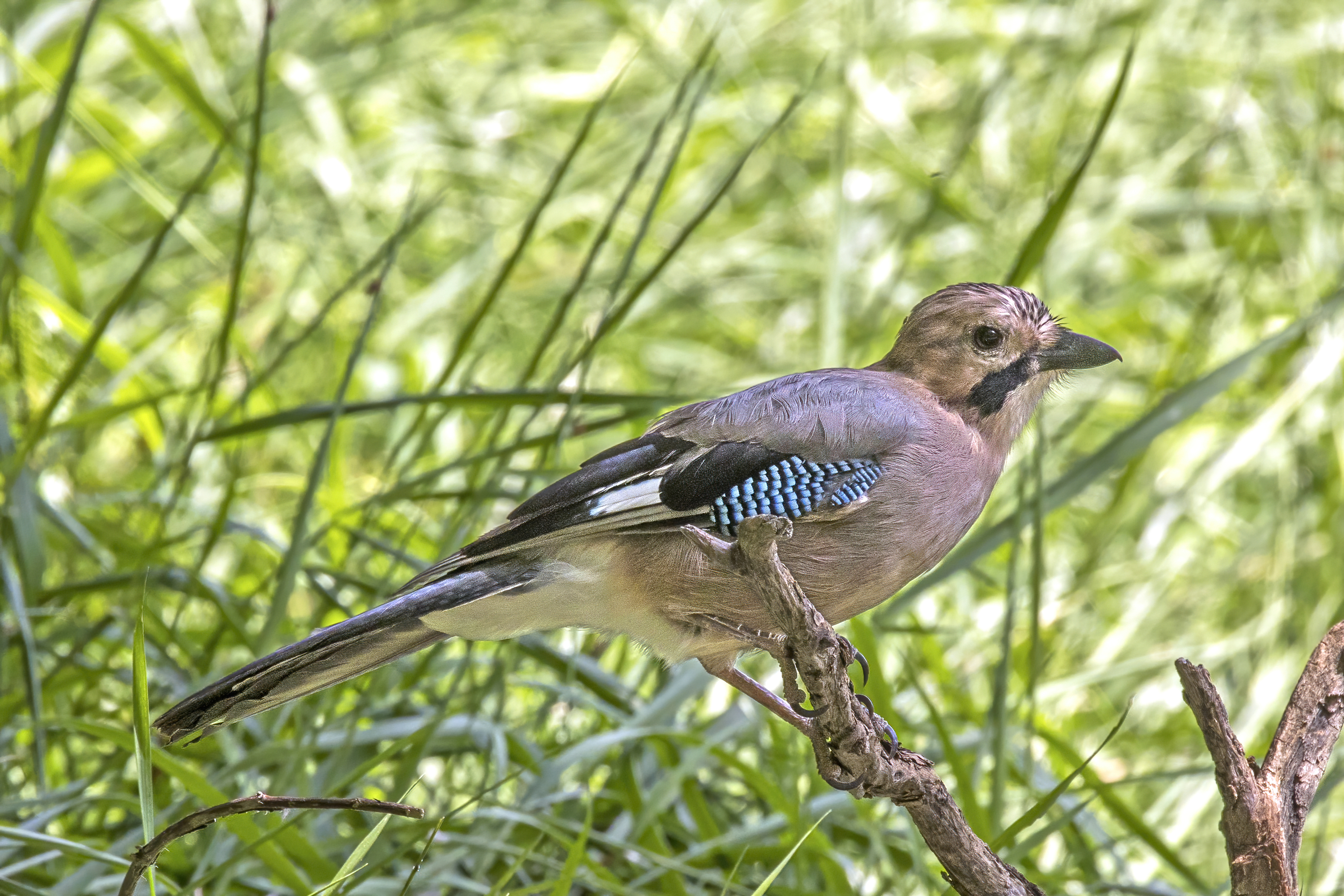
G. g. glaszneri
Troodos Mountains, Cyprus

== Description ==
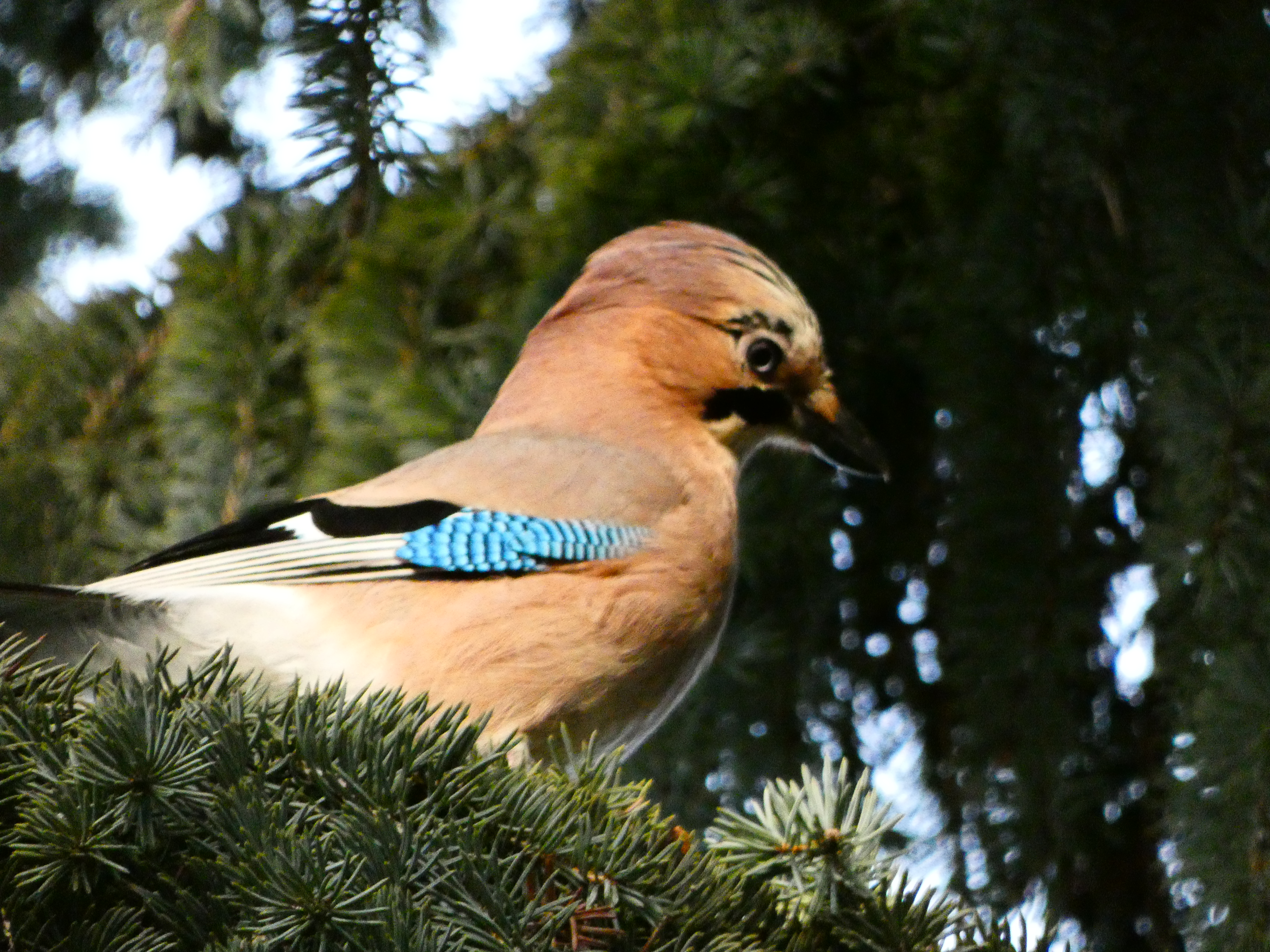
Eurasian Jay in a tree

The Eurasian jay is a relatively small corvid, similar in size to a western jackdaw (Coloeus monedula) with a length of 34–35 cm (13–14 in) and a wingspan of 52–58 cm (20–23 in). The nominate race has light rufous brown to a pinkish brown body plumage. The whitish throat is bordered on each side by a prominent black moustache stripe. The forehead and crown are whitish with black stripes. The rump is white. The complex colouring on the upper surface of the wing includes black and white bars and a prominent bright blue patch with fine black bars. The tail is mainly black.

=== Voice ===
Singing of Eurasian jay, Paris

The most characteristic call is a harsh, rasping screech that is used upon sighting various predators and as an advertising call. The jay is well known for its mimicry, often sounding so like a different species that it is difficult to distinguish its true identity unless the bird is seen. It will imitate the calls of birds of prey such as the mew of the common buzzard and the cackle of the Eurasian goshawk.

== Distribution and habitat ==
A member of the widespread jay group, it inhabits mixed woodland, particularly with oaks, and is a habitual acorn hoarder. In recent years, the bird has begun to migrate into urban areas, possibly as a result of continued erosion of its woodland habitat. Before humans began planting the trees commercially on a wide scale, Eurasian jays were the main source of movement and propagation for the European oak (Q. robur), each bird having the ability to spread more than a thousand acorns each year. Eurasian jays will also bury the acorns of other oak species, and have been cited by the National Trust as a major propagator of the largest population of holm oak (Q. ilex) in Northern Europe, situated in Ventnor on the Isle of Wight. Jays have been recorded carrying single acorns as far as 20 km, and are credited with the rapid northward spread of oaks following the last ice age.

== Behaviour and ecology ==
=== Breeding ===
Eurasian jays normally first breed when two years of age, although they occasionally breed when only one year. Both sexes build the nest which is usually placed in a fork or on a branch of a tree close to the main trunk at a height of 2–5 m (6 ft 7 in – 16 ft 5 in) above the ground. Very occasionally the nest is located on a building. The nest has a base of twigs 3–15 mm (0.12–0.59 in) in diameter and a lining of thinner twigs, roots, grass, moss and leaves. The eggs are laid daily, normally early in the morning. The clutch is 3–6 eggs which are pale green to pale olive brown and are covered with fine darker speckles. They sometimes have brown or black streaks concentrated at the broader end. The eggs are 31.3 mm × 23.0 mm (1.23 in × 0.91 in) and weigh around 8.5 g (0.30 oz). They are incubated by the female and hatch after 16–19 days. While the female is on the nest the male brings her food. Both parents feed and care for the young which fledge after 19–23 days. The parents continue to feed the fledgelings until they are 6–8 weeks of age. Only a single brood is raised each year.

The maximum recorded age is 16 years and 9 months for a bird in Skelton, York, United Kingdom, that was ringed in 1966 and found dead in 1983.

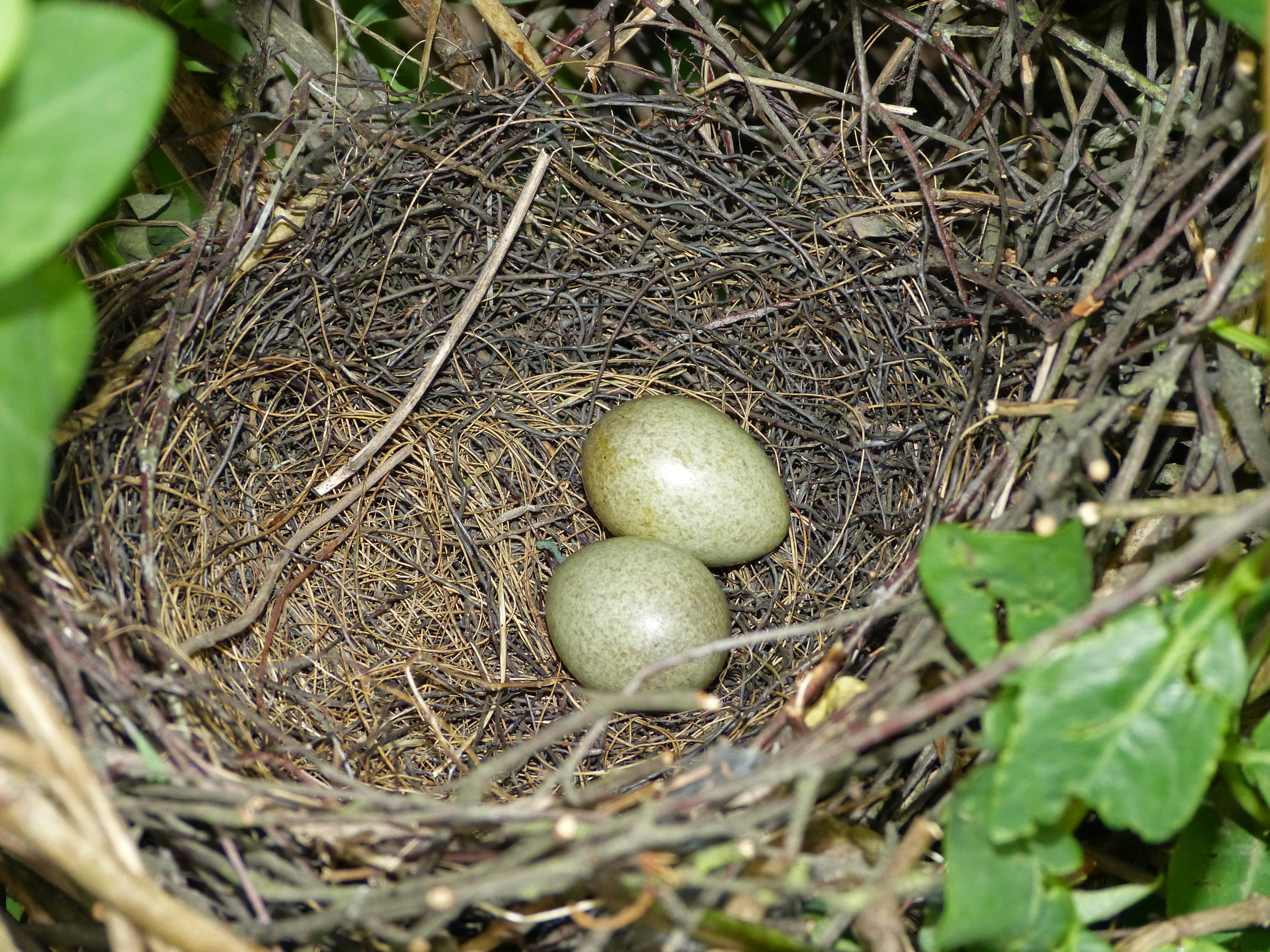
Nest with eggs

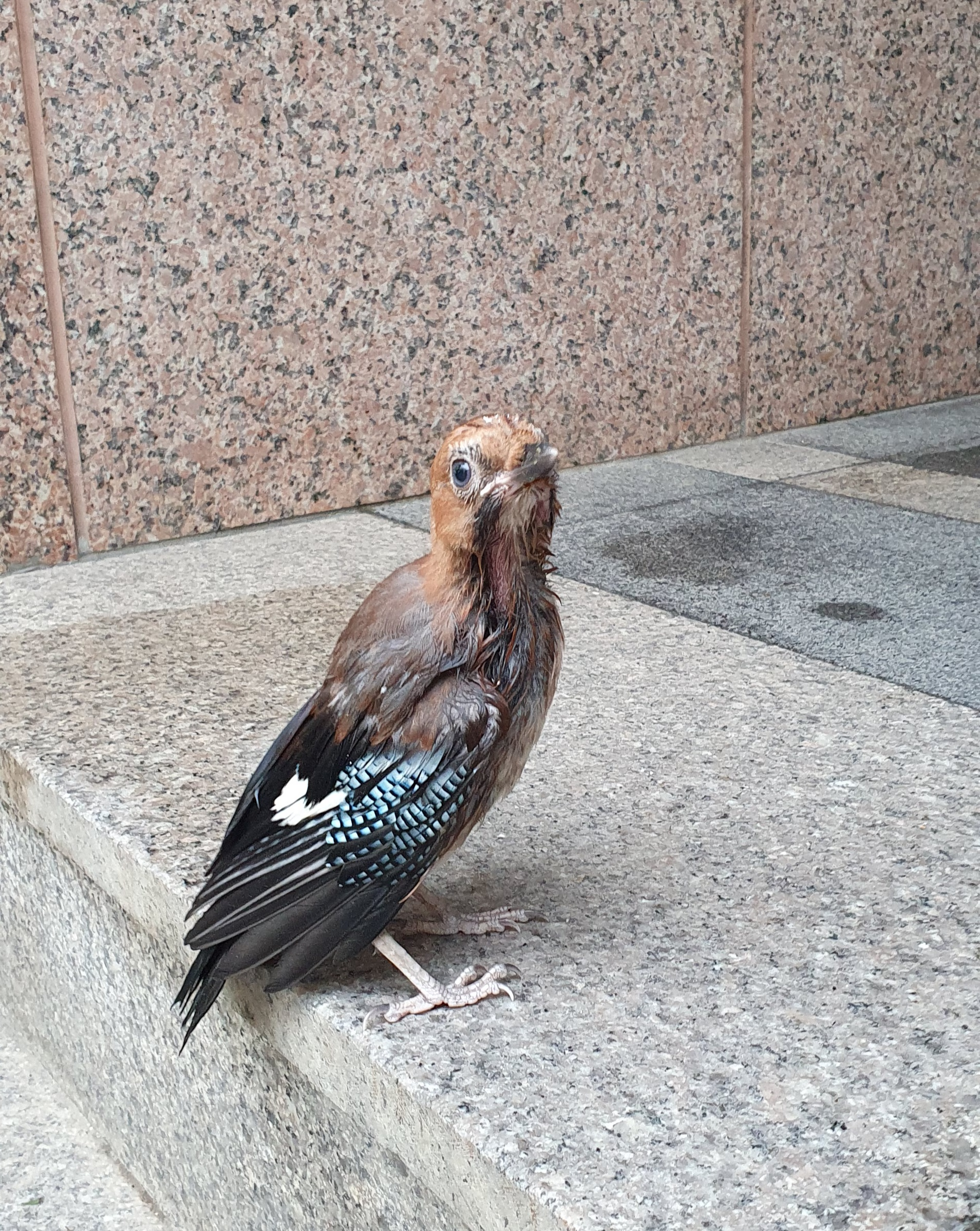
Juvenile Eurasian jay in South Korea

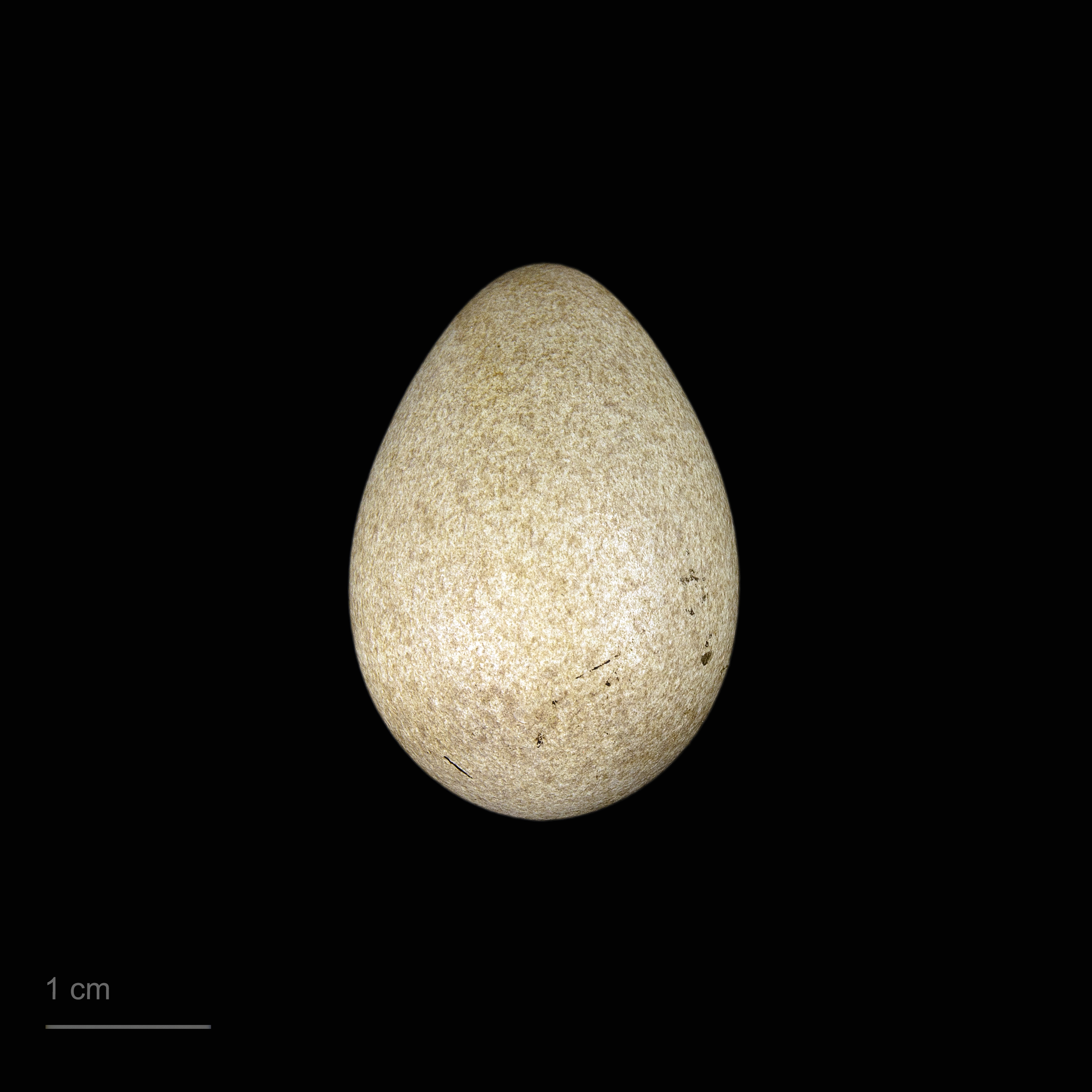
Garrulus glandarius atricapillus - MHNT

=== Diet ===
Jay eating a walnut

Feeding in both trees and on the ground, it takes a wide range of invertebrates including many pest insects, acorns (oak seeds, which it buries for use during winter), beech and other seeds, fruits such as blackberries and rowan berries, young birds and eggs, bats, and small rodents. Like most species, the jay's diet changes with the seasons but is noteworthy for its prolific caching of food—especially oak acorns and beechnuts—for winter and spring. While caching occurs throughout the year, it is most intense in the autumn.

=== Health ===
In order to keep its plumage free from parasites, it lies on top of anthills with spread wings and lets its feathers be sprayed with formic acid.

=== Intelligence ===
Similar to other corvids, Eurasian jays have been reported to plan for future needs. Male Eurasian jays also take into account the desires of their partner when sharing food with her as a courtship ritual and when protecting food items from thieving conspecifics.
