= Clive Byers =

British artist (1957–2026)

Clive Byers (8 May 1957 – 4 March 2026) was a British bird-watcher, a professional bird artist and an early "twitcher":

Take Clive, a leading member of the tribe. Many years ago, Clive went down in birding legend when he and two companions were sprayed with liquid manure by an angry farmer on whose land they were trespassing - in order, of course, to see a rare bird. As a schoolboy, he and another keen twitcher, Dick, hitchhiked from their London home to a remote Scottish island to see a rare Arctic visitor, a Steller's Eider. Four days, almost 2,000 miles and several lifts later, they finally managed to see the bird. Having achieved their goal, they simply turned round and hitched back home again. These tales of misspent youth, however, led to successful and lucrative careers. Today, Clive Byers is one of Britain's leading bird artists, while Dick Filby also makes his living from birding, organising specialist trips around the world. For birding has now gone truly global, with its devotees visiting all seven continents, including Antarctica, in search of even more exotic birds.

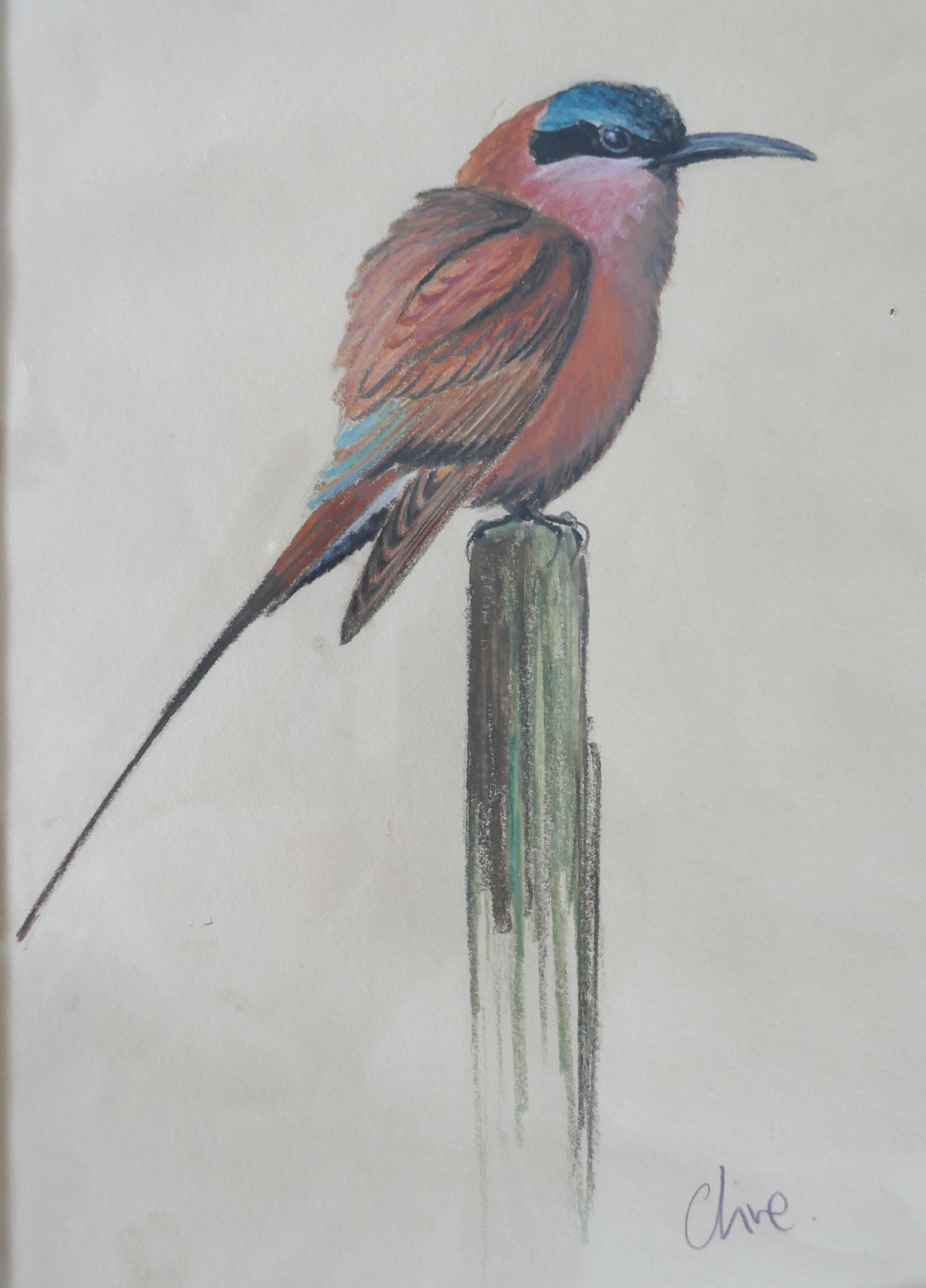
Southern Carmine Bee Eater by Clive Byers. Gouache on paper. 270 × 190 mm

His illustrations have appeared in well-known and popular bird identification guides, including Birds of the Western Palearctic and the Buntings and Sparrows volume of the Helm Identification Guides series as well as other publications including:

- A Field Guide to the Birds of South-East Asia
- Birds of the Indian Subcontinent
- Where to Watch Birds in Eastern Europe
- Birds of the Indonesian Archipelago

Byers was also the author of a series of Photographic Guides encompassing:

- Birds of Peru
- Birds of Ecuador & Galapagos
- Birds of Southern Brazil

The author's descriptive text is accompanied by images taken by a number of wild life and bird photographers.

Clive Byers started birdwatching at an early age and it was this that led him to begin drawing and painting the birds he saw. A short documentary about him produced by BBC Education's "The Eleventh Hour" shows him working and bird-watching. In the scenes of him as an 8-year-old, Clive is played by his nephew. His avid interest in birds has seen him visit every continent on either private bird-watching trips or often as lead ornithologist for tours and specialist birding group tours.

During the late 1980s while on a prolonged bird-watching trip to Kenya he was co-opted to perform the role of "Transvestite" in "The Lion of Africa".

Byers later lived in Norfolk where he was known, inter alia, for his idiosyncratic artistic creations. He died on 4 March 2026, at the age of 68.
