= Greenie =

Greenie may refer to:

- Greenie (Australian bird), an Australian lorikeet
- Greenie (Scottish bird), the European Greenfinch
- Greenie (butterfly), a subgenus of "Green hairstreak" butterflies
- The mascot of Isidore Newman School in New Orleans, Louisiana
- The mascot of Christ School in Arden, North Carolina
- Greenie (drug), a psychostimulant drug of the phenethylamine class
- A common or derogatory term for an environmentalist, a person who supports the goals of the environmental movement
- "The Greenies", an episode of the TV series The Goodies
- Greenie, the titular character in the TV series The Little Green Man
- La Salle Greenies, the varsity team representing La Salle Green Hills
- something colored green

== See also ==
- Greaney, surname
- Greany Building, a historic building in Fall River, Massachusetts
- Green (disambiguation)
- Greeny (guitar), a guitar named after its former owner, Peter Green
- Wu Tsing-fong, also known as Greeny Wu, lead singer for Sodagreen, a Taiwan indie band
