= David Quinn (bird artist) =

British bird artist

David Quinn (born 1959) is a British bird artist. He won the 1987 Bird Illustrator of the Year Award of British Birds magazine. His illustrations have appeared in several works, including the New World Warblers and Tits, Nuthatches & Treecreepers volumes of the Helm Identification Guides series, as well as accompanying identification papers in British Birds magazine.

David Quinn is based in Cheshire, where he moved to in 1983.

Quinn was educated at Salford Grammar School and Manchester Polytechnic, where he graduated BA with first class honours in graphic design in 1982.

Amongst other publications in which his illustrations are featured is the third edition of the National Geographic Field Guide to the Birds of North America, as well as the Helm Identification Guide to New World Warblers. He has also worked with Rob Hume on a guide to European gulls, yet to be published.

Quinn has found a number of rare vagrant birds in Cheshire, including a Franklin's gull at Neumann's Flash in 1987 and a first-winter American herring gull in 1994, the first accepted record for mainland Britain.
