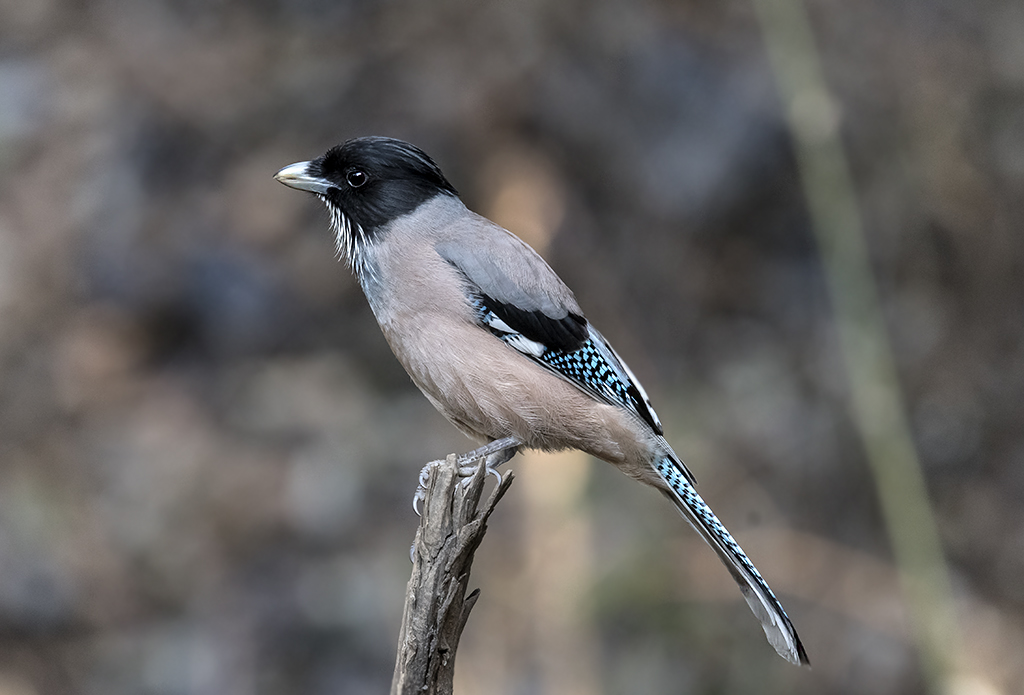
- Black-headed jay (G. lanceolatus), India

Scientific classification
- Kingdom: Animalia
- Phylum: Chordata
- Class: Aves
- Order: Passeriformes
- Family: Corvidae
- Subfamily: Corvinae
- Genus: Garrulus; Brisson, 1760

Type species
- Garrulus glandarius Linnaeus, 1758

Species
- Garrulus glandarius; Garrulus lanceolatus; Garrulus lidthi

= Garrulus =

Genus of birds

Garrulus is a genus of Old World jays, passerine birds in the family Corvidae.

== Taxonomy and systematics ==
The genus was established by French zoologist Mathurin Jacques Brisson in 1760. The type species is the Eurasian jay (Garrulus glandarius). The name Garrulus is a Latin word meaning chattering, babbling or noisy.

=== Species ===
Three species are currently accepted, though some authors split Eurasian jay into three species, thereby accepting five species in the genus.

Genus Garrulus – Brisson, 1760 – three species
Common name	Scientific name and subspecies	Range	Size and ecology	IUCN status and estimated population
Eurasian jay	Garrulus glandarius (Linnaeus, 1758) 34 subspecies in three main groups	Western Europe and north-western Africa east to the Indian subcontinent and Eastern Asia	Size: 32–37 cm Habitat: woodland Diet: omnivorous; specialising in acorns in autumn and winter	LC
Black-headed jay	Garrulus lanceolatus Vigors, 1830 Monotypic	Eastern Afghanistan east along the Himalayas, through northern India to Nepal and Bhutan	Size: 33 cm Habitat: woodland Diet: omnivorous; specialising in acorns in autumn and winter	LC
Lidth's jay	Garrulus lidthi (Bonaparte, 1850) Monotypic	Ryukyu Islands south of Japan	Size: 38 cm Habitat: woodland Diet: omnivorous	VU
