= Gulls of Europe, Asia and North America =

2004 book by Klaus Malling Olsen and Hans Larsson

- Author: Klaus Malling Olsen and Hans Larsson
- Language: English
- Series: Helm Identification Guides
- Publisher: A & C Black
- Publication date: 2004
- Publication place: U.K.
- Media type: Print (Hardback)
- Pages: 608
- ISBN: 0-7136-7087-8
- OCLC: 57006518

Gulls of Europe, Asia, and North America by Klaus Malling Olsen and Hans Larsson is a volume in the Helm Identification Guides series of bird identification books.

== Background ==
The book is intended to succeed Peter J. Grant's Gulls: A Guide to Identification as the standard identification work on Northern Hemisphere gulls. Although the Helm series already contained a volume on seabirds, by Peter Harrison, gulls compete for space in that volume with several other seabird families; in addition, Harrison's book was published in 1983, a time when knowledge of gull identification (and taxonomy) was in a considerably more primitive state (and Harrison himself was a specialist in pelagic birds rather than gulls specifically). Malling Olsen & Larsson's book equals or exceeds Grant's work in terms of its level of detail, and consolidates and synthesises the considerable amount of new information that has been discovered since then.

== History ==
The first edition of Olsen and Larsson's book was released in 2003. While the book was initially generally well-received, a large number of errors soon came to light. As a result, this edition was withdrawn, and a reprint with corrections was released in 2004. Because the publishers required only the title page of the book to be returned in order for purchasers to receive the reprint free of charge, many copies of the first printing are still in circulation. (Those with a title page are identifiable by the absence of the words "Reprinted with corrections 2004" below the publisher's address on the reverse of the title page.) The ISBN of the corrected reprint is ISBN 0-7136-7087-8.

The corrected reprint has 608 pages. In total, 43 species are given full treatment by this work — identification text, colour plates by Larsson, and several colour photographs (the plates and photographs are placed with the species texts, not grouped together in a separate section). In addition, three Southern Hemisphere species which have occurred as vagrants in the Northern Hemisphere (band-tailed gull, grey gull, and swallow-tailed gull) are covered more briefly in an appendix, with a single photograph each, and brief mention is also made here of the silver gull, which has occurred as an escape from captivity. Preceding the species accounts, an introduction covers the book's species-level taxonomy and gives general advice on gull identification, including ageing and moult, hybrid and aberrant birds, and the effects of lighting conditions, plumage wear, and fading.

The book is particularly notable as the first work to bring together information discovered during the late 1980s, 1990s, and early 21st century on the identification of birds of the large white-headed gull complex. The book adopts a conservative approach at higher taxonomic levels, lumping all gulls (except for ivory gull, Ross's gull, and the two kittiwakes) in the genus Larus. A revised taxonomy is adopted at the species level; however, a number of distinctive forms (mainly in the large white-headed gull complex) are regarded as separate species.

Species-level taxonomic decisions adopted in the book are as follows:

- American herring gull (Larus smithsonianus) is treated as a separate species from European herring gull (L. argentatus)
- Yellow-legged gull (L. michahellis) (including the form atlantis) and Armenian gull (L. armenicus) are treated as separate species from the European herring gull
- Caspian gull (L. cachinnans) is treated as a separate species from European herring and yellow-legged gulls, and is defined as including the forms barabensis and mongolicus
- Heuglin's gull (L. heuglini) (including the form taimyrensis) and Vega gull (L. vegae) (including the form birulai) are each given full species status
- Common gull (L. canus) (including the forms heinei and kamschatensis) and mew gull (L. brachyrhynchus) are treated as separate species.

Olsen and Larsson had previously collaborated on two other volumes in the Helm series, on terns and skuas.

== Errors in the second edition ==
The following is a list of errors in the corrected reprint:

- On page 21, the illustration of a gull's head, with a pointer highlighting an ear-spot, shows a bird with a full hood; ear-spots are a feature which appears on hooded gulls only when the hood (a feature of breeding plumage) is lost, in winter.
- On page 27, the caption to figure 14 (an illustration of the spread wingtip of a Caspian gull) describes a "broad white tip" on p. 9, whereas the figure shows a broad white mirror.
- On page 496, a report of 14 relict gulls in Ukraine is dated May 2001, whereas these birds were actually seen in May 2000 in the Russia/Kazakhstan border area.
- On page 276, the picture number 365 is missing (it should show an "Adult summer ssp. argenteus", according to the legend).
