= Flight Identification of Raptors of Europe, North Africa and the Middle East =

- First edition
- Author: Dick Forsman
- Language: English
- Series: Helm Identification Guides
- Subject: Ornithology
- Publisher: Christopher Helm
- Publication date: February 2016
- Publication place: United Kingdom
- Pages: 544
- ISBN: 9781472913616

Flight Identification of Raptors of Europe, North Africa and the Middle East is a 2016 field guide by Dick Forsman, a Finnish ornithologist, with the purpose of helping the reader identify raptors (birds of prey) in flight. It is part of the Helm Identification Guides series. The book is Forsman's second about raptor identification, following his 1999 book The Raptors of Europe and the Middle East, which also covered perched birds. Unlike the 1999 book, Flight Identification of Raptors covers North Africa, and includes over 60 species (compared to 43 in the first book), with both North African species and rare vagrants to the Western Palearctic region (Europe, North Africa and the Middle East), such as Pallas' fish eagle, being added. The book is a photographic field guide, and contains an introduction, two essays from other authors about topics related to raptors, and descriptions of each of the species covered. There are also discussions of common hybrids, which can make identification more complicated.

The book received positive reviews. On the Birdguides website, Josh Jones called it "a wonderful photo guide" and a "worthy addition to an esteemed series". He particularly praised the quality of the photos (many of which Forsman took himself), which were also praised by other reviewers. In a review for the British Trust for Ornithology website, Su Gough wrote "every bit of this book strikes you with the sheer amount of work and knowledge that has gone into it". Jones, as well as Andy Stoddart, in an otherwise positive review for the website Rare Bird Alert, did comment that the book lacked coverage of the sanctijohannis subspecies of the rough-legged hawk, and that a photograph of the dark morph could have been included. Several reviewers shows how difficult raptor identification is, due to the large number of possible hybrids as well as variation within species.
