= Tom Greaney =

Irish hurler (1909–1999)

Personal information
- Born: June 17, 1909
- Died: August, 1997 (aged 87–88)

Sport
- Sport: Hurling

Thomas Greaney (17 June 1909 – August 1999) was an Irish hurler. At club level he played for Dungarvan, winning a Waterford Senior Championship title in 1941, and was the centre-forward on the Waterford senior hurling team that lost the 1938 All-Ireland final.
