= Sairi Forsman =

Mexican sculptor (born 1964)

Sairi Forsman (born 1964 in Mexico City, Distrito Federal) is a Mexican sculptor of Danish descent.

Throughout her creative process, Sairi Forsman has gone through different stages: first, sculpture inspired by an early cubism; then entangled bodies, knot-forms with rounded outlines that tell stories about ancient mythologies of Western Culture; then skeletal representations of humans and animals. She is inspired by literature, painting, dance, sculpture and cinema.

She has participated in collective exhibitions and has had solo shows sponsored by institutions, such as the Universidad Nacional Autónoma de México, the Instituto Nacional de Bellas Artes, the Poliforum Cultural Siquieros and the Palacio de Mineria. Her work has been published by the art magazine "Artes de Mexico" as well as the European Economic Community. She has won the Nordic Arts Center fellowship in Helsinki, Finland. The sculptures "Fantasy I", "Temptation", "Perses", "The Cannibal" and "Au Prin-Temps" are large-scale pieces. They are installed in public places and are on permanent view.
