= Hilary Burn =

English wildlife illustrator

Hilary Burn (born 8 April 1946 in Macclesfield, Cheshire) is an English wildlife illustrator.

== Career ==
Burn is the daughter of Colin Barber, an engineering draughtsman. She attended the Macclesfield High School and studied at the University of Leeds where she graduated to Bachelor of Science in zoology. From 1968 to 1971 she was a biology teacher at a comprehensive school in Leeds. In 1971 she began her career as illustrator for natural history books and she illustrated birds in gouache. In 1983 she was elected member of the Society of Wildlife Artists. Burn illustrated many ornithological works, including 15 volumes of the Handbook of the Birds of the World and the Helm Identification Guides.

== Selected works ==
- Handbook of the Birds of the World, Lynx Edicions (1994 - 2011, volumes 2 to 16)
- Wildfowl: An Identification Guide, Helm, 1988
- Crows and Jays, Helm
- Handbook of Bird Identification, Helm
- RSPB Book of British Birds, Macmillan
- RSPB Handbook of British Birds
- James Eaton, Bas van Balen, N. W. Brickle, Frank E. Rheindt: Birds of the Indonesian Archipelago., 2016.
