= Darren Forssman =

Australian rules footballer and coach

Personal information
- Full name: Darren Forssman
- Born: 14 September 1970 (age 56)
- Original team: Colac
- Height: 180 cm (5 ft 11 in)
- Weight: 77 kg (170 lb)

Playing career^{1}
Years	Club	Games (Goals)
1990–1994	Geelong	45 (35)
- ^{1} Playing statistics correct to the end of 1994.

Darren Forssman (born 14 September 1970) is a former Australian rules footballer who played with Geelong in the Australian Football League (AFL).

A utility, Geelong recruited Forssman from Colac. Forssman made 15 appearances in the 1992 AFL season, but an ankle injury cost him a chance of playing in that year's grand final.

Forssman has coached Geelong Football League clubs Colac and Geelong West St Peters, and was assistant coach of the Geelong West Giants senior women's team, alongside Steve Toohey.
