= Steve Madge =

British birder (1948–2020)

Steve Madge (15 January 1948 – July 2020) was a birder, author, and bird tour leader, based in Cornwall, England.

He was a member of the British Birds Rarities Committee and president of the Cornwall Birdwatching and Preservation Society.

He wrote three volumes in the Helm Identification Guides series - on Wildfowl, Crows and Jays and Pheasants, Partridges & Grouse, and co-authored The Handbook of Bird Identification (1998) with Mark Beaman.
