= Nigel Cleere =

English ornithologist

- Born: September 21, 1955 (age 71); Newbury, Berkshire
- Occupation: Ornithologist

Nigel Cleere (born 21 September 1955) is an English ornithologist. He is best known for his book, Nightjars : A Guide to the Nightjars, Nighthawks, and Their Relatives. He joined BioMap in 2002, helping to catalogue Colombian birds found in the ornithological collections held in natural history museums throughout North America and Europe.
