= Harold F. Greeney =

American biologist

Harold Francis Greeney III (born 1972) is an American biologist best known for establishing the Yanayacu Biological Research Station and Center for Creative Studies on the eastern slopes of Antisana volcano in Ecuador. He received his PhD from the Department of Behavioural Ecology, University of Wrocław, Wrocław, Poland in 2008, his MSc from Department of Entomology at the University of Arizona in 1999, and his BSc at Wake Forest University in 1993.

He is an author on over 500 peer-reviewed biological research articles concerning the ecology, behavior, and evolution of invertebrate and vertebrate species. Greeney's work on the reproductive biology of neotropical birds resulted in a Pamela and Alexander F. Skutch Research Award by the Association of Field Ornithologists in 2005, and a John Simon Guggenheim Fellowship in 2015. Although he has published information on the nesting behavior of more than 700 species of birds, Greeney is well known for his interest in antpittas, about which he published an authoritative book in 2018.

His passion and skill for finding bird nests, especially of rare or difficult to find species, have led to Greeney's participation in several nature documentaries such as Hummingbirds: Magic in the Air, An Original DUCKumentary, and Hummingbirds: Jewelled Messengers, as either a scientific consultant or in an on-air role.

Along with a group of North American collaborators, Greeney has maintained an active NSF-funded research program entitled Collaborative Research: Caterpillars and Parasitoids in the Andes of Eastern Ecuador since 2004.

Greeney has three children.
