= Dick Forsman =

Finnish ornithologist (b.1953)

Dick Forsman (born 1953 in Helsinki) is a Finnish ornithologist. He is the author of The Raptors of Europe and the Middle East: A Handbook of Field Identification which was selected as one of Birdwatch's Outstanding Bird Books of 1998 due in part to its photography. Forsman is also the author of Flight Identification of Raptors of Europe, North Africa and the Middle East, which was published in 2016. Both books were published by Bloomsbury imprint Christopher Helm.
