= Greany Building =

- U.S. National Register of Historic Places
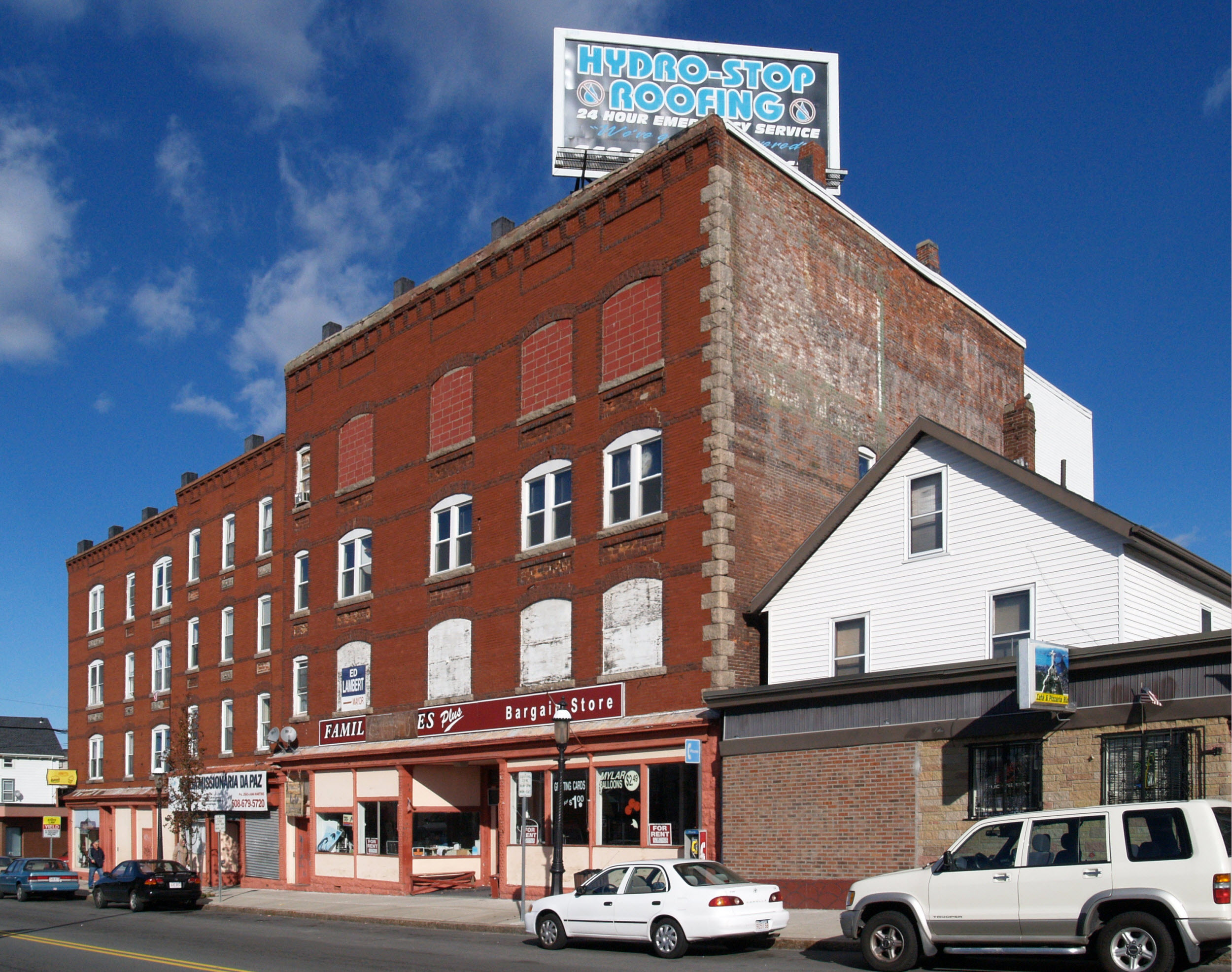

- Location within Massachusetts Location within the United States
- Location: 1270-1288 Pleasant St., Fall River, Massachusetts
- Coordinates: 41°41′31″N 71°8′10″W
- Built: 1891
- Architectural style: Late Victorian
- MPS: Fall River MRA
- NRHP reference No.: 83000674
- Added to NRHP: February 16, 1983

The Greany Building is a historic mixed-use commercial and residential building located at 1270–1288 Pleasant Street in Fall River, Massachusetts.

== Description and history ==
It is a large four-story brick building designed in a vernacular late Victorian commercial style. The building was constructed in 1891 for Thomas Greany, who operated a dry goods retail operation in part of the first floor, while the upstairs housed 15 residential units. In 1896, Rinfret Bros., a clothier, occupied part of the premises. The building is one of Fall River's finest surviving 19th-century commercial buildings.

The building was listed on the National Register of Historic Places on February 16, 1983.

== See also ==
- National Register of Historic Places listings in Fall River, Massachusetts
