= List of birds of Morocco =

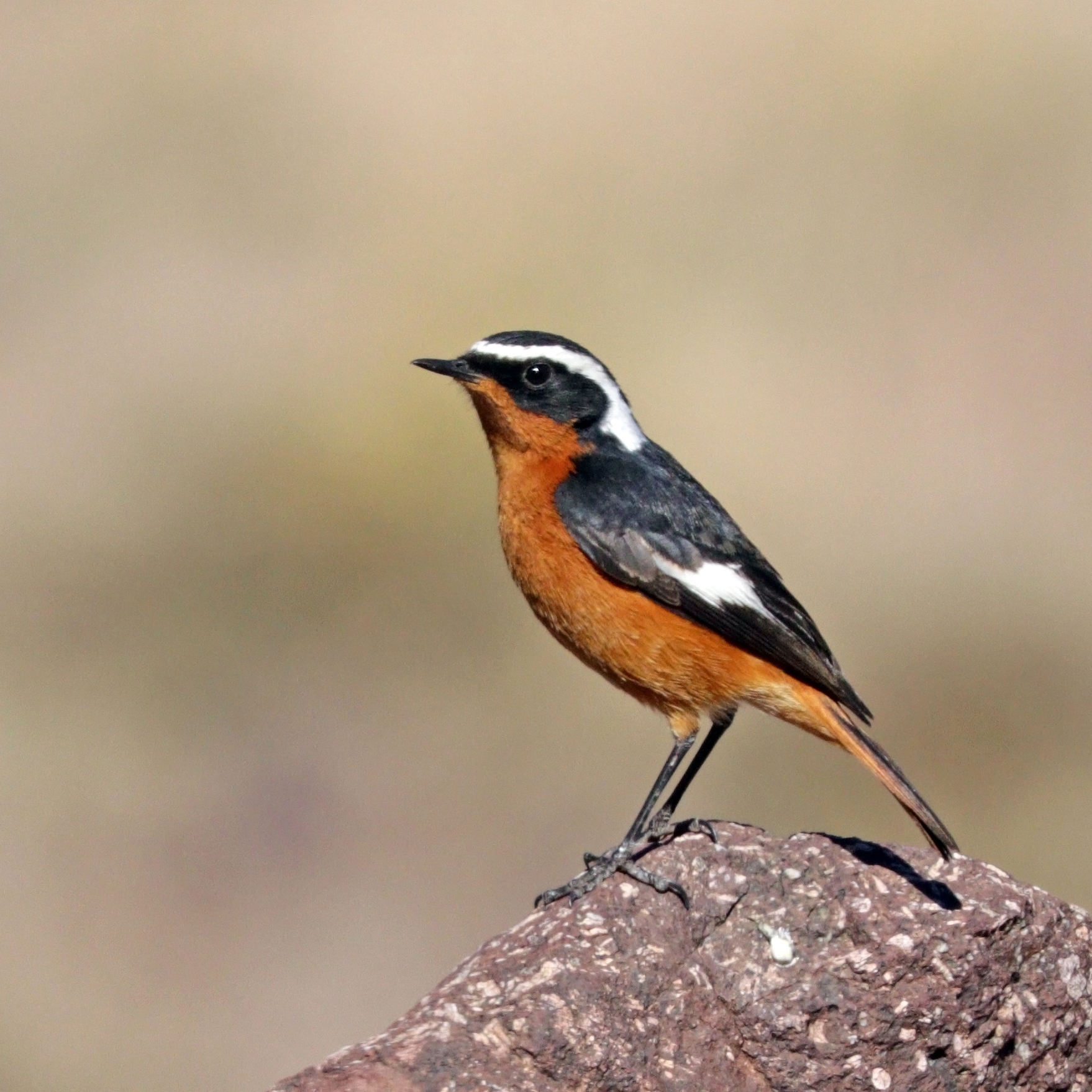
Moussier's redstart is the national bird of Morocco.

This is a list of the bird species recorded in Morocco. The avifauna of Morocco include a total of 563 species. Three of them have been introduced by humans.

This list's taxonomic treatment (designation and sequence of orders, families and species) and nomenclature (English and scientific names) are those of The Clements Checklist of Birds of the World, 2022 edition.

The following tags have been used to highlight several categories of occurrence.

- (A) Accidental - a species that only rarely occurs in Morocco; records of these species require formal acceptance by the Commission d'Homologation Marocaine (Moroccan Rare Birds Committee)
- (I) Introduced - a species introduced to Morocco as a consequence, direct or indirect, of human actions, and has become established
- (Ex) Extirpated - a species that no longer occurs in Morocco although populations exist elsewhere

== Ostriches ==
Order: Struthioniformes Family: Struthionidae

The ostriches are a flightless birds native to Africa. They are the largest living species of bird and are distinctive in appearance, with a long neck and legs and the ability to run at high speeds. This species was extirpated from Morocco some time before 1990; a re-introduction programme for the North African ostrich is in progress.

- Common ostrich, Struthio camelus
  - North African ostrich, Struthio camelus camelus reintroduced

== Ducks, geese, and waterfowl ==
Order: Anseriformes Family: Anatidae

Anatidae includes the ducks and most duck-like waterfowl such as swans and geese.

- Fulvous whistling-duck, Dendrocygna bicolor (A)
- Snow goose, Anser caerulescens (A)
- Graylag goose, Anser anser
- Greater white-fronted goose, Anser albifrons (A)
- Taiga bean-goose, Anser fabalis (A)
- Bar-headed goose, Anser indicus (A)
- Brant, Branta bernicla (A)
- Barnacle goose, Branta leucopsis (A)
- Mute swan, Cygnus olor (A)
- Whooper swan, Cygnus cygnus (A)
- Egyptian goose, Alopochen aegyptiacus (A)
- Ruddy shelduck, Tadorna ferruginea
- Common shelduck, Tadorna tadorna
- Spur-winged goose, Plectropterus gambensis (A)
- Mandarin duck, Aix galericulata (I)
- Garganey, Spatula querquedula
- Blue-winged teal, Spatula discors (A)
- Cinnamon teal, Spatula cyanoptera (A)
- Cape shoveler, Spatula smithii (A)
- Northern shoveler, Spatula clypeata
- Gadwall, Mareca strepera
- Eurasian wigeon, Mareca penelope
- American wigeon, Mareca americana (A)
- Mallard, Anas platyrhynchos
- Northern pintail, Anas acuta
- Green-winged teal, Anas crecca
- Marbled teal, Marmaronetta angustirostris
- Southern pochard, Netta erythrophtalma (A)
- Red-crested pochard, Netta rufina
- Common pochard, Aythya ferina
- Ring-necked duck, Aythya collaris (A)
- Ferruginous duck, Aythya nyroca
- Tufted duck, Aythya fuligula
- Greater scaup, Aythya marila (A)
- Lesser scaup, Aythya affinis (A)
- Common eider, Somateria mollissima (A)
- Velvet scoter, Melanitta fusca (A)
- Common scoter, Melanitta nigra
- Long-tailed duck, Clangula hyemalis (A)
- Common goldeneye, Bucephala clangula (A)
- Smew, Mergellus albellus (A)
- Common merganser, Mergus merganser (A)
- Red-breasted merganser, Mergus serrator
- Ruddy duck, Oxyura jamaicensis (I)
- White-headed duck, Oxyura leucocephala

== Guineafowl ==
Order: Galliformes Family: Numididae

Guineafowl are a group of African birds that resemble partridges, but with featherless heads and spangled grey plumage.

- Helmeted guineafowl, Numida meleagris reintroduced

== Pheasant, grouse, and allies ==
Order: Galliformes Family: Phasianidae

Phasianidae are a family of terrestrial birds which consists of quails, partridges, francolins and pheasants. In general, they are plump (although they vary in size) and have broad, relatively short wings.

- Rock ptarmigan, Lagopus muta (A)
- Ring-necked pheasant, Phasianus colchicus (I)
- Common quail, Coturnix coturnix
- Barbary partridge, Alectoris barbara
- Double-spurred francolin, Pternistis bicalcaratus

== Flamingos ==
Order: Phoenicopteriformes Family: Phoenicopteridae

Flamingos are gregarious wading birds, usually 3 to 5 feet (0.9 to 1.5 m) tall, found in both the Western and Eastern Hemispheres.

- Greater flamingo, Phoenicopterus roseus
- Lesser flamingo, Phoeniconaias minor (A)

== Grebes ==
Order: Podicipediformes Family: Podicipedidae

Grebes are small to medium-large freshwater diving birds.

- Little grebe, Tachybaptus ruficollis
- Horned grebe, Podiceps auritus (A)
- Red-necked grebe, Podiceps grisegena (A)
- Great crested grebe, Podiceps cristatus
- Eared grebe, Podiceps nigricollis

== Pigeons and doves ==
Order: Columbiformes Family: Columbidae

Pigeons and doves are stout-bodied birds with short necks and short slender bills with a fleshy cere.

- Rock pigeon, Columba livia
- Stock dove, Columba oenas
- Trocaz pigeon, Columba trocaz (A)
- Common wood-pigeon, Columba palumbus
- European turtle-dove, Streptopelia turtur
- Eurasian collared-dove, Streptopelia decaocto
- African collared-dove, Streptopelia roseogrisea (A)
- Laughing dove, Streptopelia senegalensis
- Namaqua dove, Oena capensis (A)

== Sandgrouse ==
Order: Pterocliformes Family: Pteroclidae

Sandgrouse have small, pigeon-like, heads and necks, but sturdy compact bodies.

- Pin-tailed sandgrouse, Pterocles alchata
- Spotted sandgrouse, Pterocles senegallus
- Black-bellied sandgrouse, Pterocles orientalis
- Crowned sandgrouse, Pterocles coronatus
- Lichtenstein's sandgrouse, Pterocles lichtensteinii

== Bustards ==
Order: Otidiformes Family: Otididae

Bustards are large terrestrial birds mainly associated with dry open country and steppes in the Old World. The Arabian bustard has been extirpated from Morocco since about 1985 and the houbara bustard is close to being extirpated.

- Great bustard, Otis tarda
- Houbara bustard, Chlamydotis undulata
- Little bustard, Tetrax tetrax

== Cuckoos ==
Order: Cuculiformes Family: Cuculidae

The cuckoos are birds are of variable size with slender bodies, long tails, and strong legs.

- Great spotted cuckoo, Clamator glandarius
- Yellow-billed cuckoo, Coccyzus americanus (A)
- Common cuckoo, Cuculus canorus

== Nightjars and allies ==
Order: Caprimulgiformes Family: Caprimulgidae

Nightjars are medium-sized nocturnal birds with long wings, short legs, and very short bills.

- Red-necked nightjar, Caprimulgus ruficollis
- Eurasian nightjar, Caprimulgus europaeus
- Egyptian nightjar, Caprimulgus aegyptius
- Nubian nightjar, Caprimulgus nubicus (A)
- Golden nightjar, Caprimulgus eximius (A)

== Swifts ==
Order: Caprimulgiformes Family: Apodidae

Swifts are small birds which spend the majority of their lives flying.

- Chimney swift, Chaetura pelagica (A)
- Alpine swift, Apus melba
- Common swift, Apus apus
- Plain swift, Apus unicolor (A)
- Pallid swift, Apus pallidus
- Little swift, Apus affinis
- White-rumped swift, Apus caffer

== Rails, gallinules, and coots ==
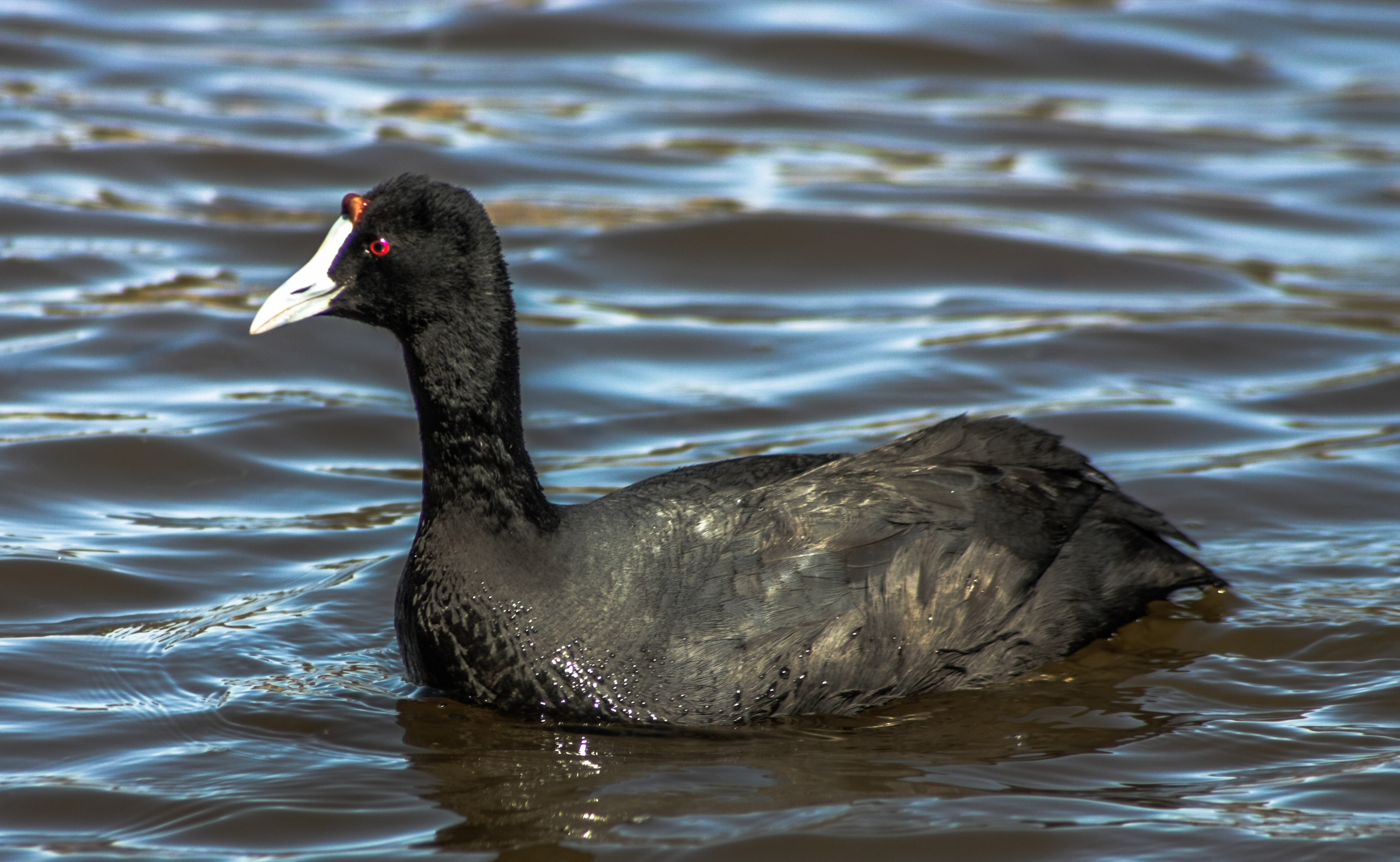
A red-knobbed coot in Ifrane

Order: Gruiformes Family: Rallidae

Rallidae is a large family of small to medium-sized birds which includes the rails, crakes, coots, and gallinules.

- Water rail, Rallus aquaticus
- Corn crake, Crex crex
- African crake, Crex egregia (A)
- Sora, Porzana carolina (A)
- Spotted crake, Porzana porzana
- Lesser moorhen, Paragallinula angulata (A)
- Eurasian moorhen, Gallinula chloropus
- Eurasian coot, Fulica atra
- Red-knobbed coot, Fulica cristata
- Allen's gallinule, Porphyrio alleni (A)
- Purple gallinule, Porphyrio martinica (A)
- Western swamphen, Porphyrio porphyrio
- Striped crake, Amaurornis marginalis (A)
- Little crake, Porzana parva
- Baillon's crake, Porzana pusilla

== Cranes ==
Order: Gruiformes Family: Gruidae

Cranes are large, long-legged, and long-necked birds. The demoiselle crane has been extirpated since 1985.

- Common crane, Grus grus

== Thick-knees ==
Order: Charadriiformes Family: Burhinidae

The thick-knees are a group of waders found worldwide within the tropical zone, with some species also breeding in temperate Europe and Australia. Despite being classed as waders, most species have a preference for arid or semi-arid habitats.

- Eurasian thick-knee, Burhinus oedicnemus
- Senegal thick-knee, Burhinus senegalensis (A)

== Stilts and avocets ==
Order: Charadriiformes Family: Recurvirostridae

Recurvirostridae is a family of large wading birds which includes the avocets and stilts.

- Black-winged stilt, Himantopus himantopus
- Pied avocet, Recurvirostra avosetta

== Oystercatchers ==
Order: Charadriiformes Family: Haematopodidae

The oystercatchers are large and noisy plover-like birds, with strong bills used for smashing or prising open molluscs.

- Eurasian oystercatcher, Haematopus ostralegus

== Plovers and lapwings ==
Order: Charadriiformes Family: Charadriidae

The family Charadriidae includes the plovers, dotterels, and lapwings. They are small to medium-sized birds with compact bodies, short thick necks, and long, usually pointed, wings.

- Black-bellied plover, Pluvialis squatarola
- European golden-plover, Pluvialis apricaria
- American golden-plover, Pluvialis dominica (A)
- Pacific golden-plover, Pluvialis fulva (A)
- Northern lapwing, Vanellus vanellus
- Sociable lapwing, Vanellus gregarius (A)
- White-tailed lapwing, Vanellus leucurus (A)
- Greater sand-plover, Charadrius leschenaultii (A)
- Kittlitz's plover, Charadrius pecuarius (A)
- Kentish plover, Charadrius alexandrinus
- Common ringed plover, Charadrius hiaticula
- Little ringed plover, Charadrius dubius
- Eurasian dotterel, Charadrius morinellus

== Painted-snipes ==
Order: Charadriiformes Family: Rostratulidae

Painted-snipes are short-legged, long-billed birds similar in shape to the true snipes, but more brightly coloured.

- Greater painted-snipe, Rostratula benghalensis (A)

== Sandpipers and allies ==
Order: Charadriiformes Family: Scolopacidae

Scolopacidae is a large diverse family of small to medium-sized waders including the sandpipers, curlews, godwits, shanks, woodcocks, snipes, dowitchers, and phalaropes. The majority of these species eat small invertebrates picked out of the mud or soil. Variation in length of legs and bills enables multiple species to feed in the same habitat, particularly on the coast, without direct competition for food.

- Upland sandpiper, Bartramia longicauda (A)
- Whimbrel, Numenius phaeopus
- Eurasian curlew, Numenius arquata
- Bar-tailed godwit, Limosa lapponica
- Black-tailed godwit, Limosa limosa
- Ruddy turnstone, Arenaria interpres
- Great knot, Calidris tenuirostris (A)
- Red knot, Calidris canutus
- Ruff, Calidris pugnax
- Broad-billed sandpiper, Calidris falcinellus (A)
- Stilt sandpiper, Calidris himantopus (A)
- Curlew sandpiper, Calidris ferruginea
- Temminck's stint, Calidris temminckii
- Sanderling, Calidris alba
- Dunlin, Calidris alpina
- Purple sandpiper, Calidris maritima (A)
- Baird's sandpiper, Calidris bairdii (A)
- Little stint, Calidris minuta
- White-rumped sandpiper, Calidris fuscicollis (A)
- Buff-breasted sandpiper, Calidris subruficollis (A)
- Pectoral sandpiper, Calidris melanotos (A)
- Semipalmated sandpiper, Calidris pusilla (A)
- Long-billed dowitcher, Limnodromus scolopaceus (A)
- Jack snipe, Lymnocryptes minimus
- Eurasian woodcock, Scolopax rusticola
- Great snipe, Gallinago media
- Common snipe, Gallinago gallinago
- Terek sandpiper, Xenus cinereus (A)
- Wilson's phalarope, Phalaropus tricolor (A)
- Red-necked phalarope, Phalaropus lobatus (A)
- Red phalarope, Phalaropus fulicarius
- Common sandpiper, Actitis hypoleucos
- Spotted sandpiper, Actitis macularia (A)
- Green sandpiper, Tringa ochropus
- Spotted redshank, Tringa erythropus
- Greater yellowlegs, Tringa melanoleuca (A)
- Common greenshank, Tringa nebularia
- Lesser yellowlegs, Tringa flavipes (A)
- Marsh sandpiper, Tringa stagnatilis
- Wood sandpiper, Tringa glareola
- Common redshank, Tringa totanus

== Buttonquail ==
Order: Charadriiformes Family: Turnicidae

The buttonquails are small, drab, running birds which resemble the true quails. This species is close to being extirpated in Morocco.

- Small buttonquail, Turnix sylvaticus

== Pratincoles and coursers ==
Order: Charadriiformes Family: Glareolidae

Glareolidae is a family of wading birds comprising the pratincoles, which have short legs, long pointed wings, and long forked tails, and the coursers, which have long legs, short wings, and long, pointed bills which curve downwards.

- Cream-colored courser, Cursorius cursor
- Collared pratincole, Glareola pratincola
- Black-winged pratincole, Glareola nordmanni (A)

== Skuas and jaegers ==
Order: Charadriiformes Family: Stercorariidae

The family Stercorariidae are, in general, medium to large birds, typically with grey or brown plumage, often with white markings on the wings.

- Great skua, Stercorarius skua
- South polar skua, Stercorarius maccormicki (A)
- Pomarine jaeger, Stercorarius pomarinus
- Parasitic jaeger, Stercorarius parasiticus
- Long-tailed jaeger, Stercorarius longicaudus (A)

== Auks, murres, and puffins ==
Order: Charadriiformes Family: Alcidae

Alcidae live on the open sea, only deliberately coming ashore to nest.

- Dovekie, Alle alle (A)
- Common murre, Uria aalge (A)
- Razorbill, Alca torda
- Atlantic puffin, Fratercula arctica

== Gulls, terns, and skimmers ==
Order: Charadriiformes Family: Laridae

Laridae is a family of medium to large seabirds, the gulls, terns, and skimmers. Gulls are typically grey or white, often with black markings on the head or wings. They have stout, longish bills and webbed feet. Terns are a group of generally medium to large seabirds typically with grey or white plumage, often with black markings on the head. Skimmers are a small family of tropical tern-like birds.

- Black-legged kittiwake, Rissa tridactyla
- Sabine's gull, Xema sabini
- Slender-billed gull, Chroicocephalus genei
- Bonaparte's gull, Chroicocephalus philadelphia (A)
- Gray-hooded gull, Chroicocephalus cirrocephalus (A)
- Black-headed gull, Chroicocephalus ridibundus
- Little gull, Hydrocoloeus minutus
- Laughing gull, Leucophaeus atricilla (A)
- Franklin's gull, Leucophaeus pipixcan (A)
- Mediterranean gull, Ichthyaetus melanocephalus
- Pallas's gull, Ichthyaetus ichthyaetus (A)
- Audouin's gull, Ichthyaetus audouinii
- Common gull, Larus canus
- Ring-billed gull, Larus delawarensis (A)
- Herring gull, Larus argentatus
- Yellow-legged gull, Larus michahellis
- Caspian gull, Larus cachinnans (A)
- Iceland gull, Larus glaucoides (A)
- Lesser black-backed gull, Larus fuscus
- Glaucous-winged gull, Larus glaucescens (A)
- Glaucous gull, Larus hyperboreus (A)
- Great black-backed gull, Larus marinus
- Kelp gull, Larus dominicanus (A)
- Brown noddy, Anous stolidus (A)
- Sooty tern, Onychoprion fuscata (A)
- Bridled tern, Onychoprion anaethetus
- Little tern, Sternula albifrons
- Gull-billed tern, Gelochelidon nilotica
- Caspian tern, Hydroprogne caspia
- Black tern, Chlidonias niger
- White-winged tern, Chlidonias leucopterus
- Whiskered tern, Chlidonias hybrida
- Roseate tern, Sterna dougallii
- Common tern, Sterna hirundo
- Arctic tern, Sterna paradisaea
- Sandwich tern, Thalasseus sandvicensis
- Lesser crested tern, Thalasseus bengalensis
- West African crested tern, Thalasseus albididorsalis
- African skimmer, Rynchops flavirostris (A)

== Loons ==
Order: Gaviiformes Family: Gaviidae

Loons are a group of aquatic birds found in many parts of the Northern Hemisphere.

- Yellow-billed loon, Gavia adamsii (A)
- Red-throated loon, Gavia stellata (A)
- Arctic loon, Gavia arctica (A)
- Common loon, Gavia immer (A)

== Tropicbirds ==
Order: Phaethontiformes Family: Phaethontidae

Tropicbirds are slender white birds of tropical oceans, with exceptionally long central tail feathers. Their heads and long wings have black markings.

- Red-billed tropicbird, Phaethon aethereus (A)

== Albatrosses ==
Order: Procellariiformes Family: Diomedeidae

The albatrosses are among the largest of flying birds, and the great albatrosses from the genus Diomedea have the largest wingspans of any extant birds.

- Black-browed albatross, Thalassarche melanophris (A)

== Southern storm-petrels ==
Order: Procellariiformes Family: Oceanitidae

The storm-petrels are the smallest seabirds, relatives of the petrels, feeding on planktonic crustaceans and small fish picked from the surface, typically while hovering. The flight is fluttering and sometimes bat-like. Until 2018, this family's species were included with the other storm-petrels in family Hydrobatidae.

- Wilson's storm-petrel, Oceanites oceanicus
- White-faced storm-petrel, Pelagodroma marina (A)

== Northern storm-petrels ==
Order: Procellariiformes Family: Hydrobatidae

Though the members of this family are similar in many respects to the southern storm-petrels, including their general appearance and habits, there are enough genetic differences to warrant their placement in a separate family.

- European storm-petrel, Hydrobates pelagicus
- Leach's storm-petrel, Hydrobates leucorhous
- Band-rumped storm-petrel, Hydrobates castro (A)

== Shearwaters and petrels ==
Order: Procellariiformes Family: Procellariidae

The procellariids are the main group of medium-sized "true petrels", characterised by united nostrils with medium septum and a long outer functional primary.

- Northern fulmar, Fulmarus glacialis (A)
- Zino's petrel, Pterodroma madeira (A)
- Fea's petrel, Pterodroma feae
- Black-capped petrel, Pterodroma hasitata (A)
- Bulwer's petrel, Bulweria bulwerii (A)
- Cory's shearwater, Calonectris diomedia
- Cape Verde shearwater, Calonectris edwardsii (A)
- Great shearwater, Ardenna gravis
- Sooty shearwater, Ardenna griseus
- Manx shearwater, Puffinus puffinus
- Yelkouan shearwater, Puffinus yelkouan
- Balearic shearwater, Puffinus mauretanicus
- Barolo shearwater, Puffinus baroli (A)
- Persian shearwater, Puffinus persicus

== Storks ==
Order: Ciconiiformes Family: Ciconiidae

Storks are large, long-legged, long-necked wading birds with long, stout bills. Their nests can be large and may be reused for many years. Many species are migratory.

- Black stork, Ciconia nigra
- White stork, Ciconia ciconia
- Marabou stork, Leptoptilos crumenifer (A)
- Yellow-billed stork, Mycteria ibis (A)

== Frigatebirds ==
Order: Suliformes Family: Fregatidae

Frigatebirds are large seabirds usually found over tropical oceans. They are large, black-and-white, or completely black, with long wings and deeply forked tails. The males have colored inflatable throat pouches. They do not swim or walk and cannot take off from a flat surface. Having the largest wingspan-to-body-weight ratio of any bird, they are essentially aerial, able to stay aloft for more than a week.

- Magnificent frigatebird, Fregata magnificens (A)

== Boobies and gannets ==
Order: Suliformes Family: Sulidae

The sulids comprise the gannets and boobies. Both groups are seabirds that plunge-dive for fish.

- Masked booby, Sula dactylatra (A)
- Brown booby, Sula leucogaster (A)
- Northern gannet, Morus bassanus
- Cape gannet, Morus capensis (A)

== Anhingas ==
Order: Suliformes Family: Anhingidae

Anhingas or darters are water birds with a distinctive long slender neck and bill.

- African darter, Anhinga rufa (A)

== Cormorants and shags ==
Order: Suliformes Family: Phalacrocoracidae

Phalacrocoracidae is a family of medium to large fish-eating waterbirds.

- Long-tailed cormorant, Microcarbo africanus (A)
- Great cormorant, Phalacrocorax carbo
- European shag, Gulosus aristotelis

== Pelicans ==
Order: Pelecaniformes Family: Pelecanidae

Pelicans are large water birds with a distinctive pouch under their beak.

- Great white pelican, Pelecanus onocrotalus (A)
- Pink-backed pelican, Pelecanus rufescens (A)

== Herons, egrets, and bitterns ==
Order: Pelecaniformes Family: Ardeidae

The family Ardeidae contains the bitterns, herons, and egrets. Herons and egrets are medium to large wading birds with long necks and legs. Bitterns tend to be shorter necked and more wary. Members of Ardeidae fly with their necks retracted, unlike other long-necked birds such as storks, ibises and spoonbills.

- American bittern, Botaurus lentiginosus (A)
- Great bittern, Botaurus stellaris
- Little bittern, Ixobrychus minutus
- Gray heron, Ardea cinerea
- Purple heron, Ardea purpurea
- Great egret, Ardea alba
- Great blue heron, Ardea herodias (A)
- Intermediate egret, Ardea intermedia (A)
- Little egret, Egretta garzetta
- Western reef-heron, Egretta gularis (A)
- Cattle egret, Bubulcus ibis
- Squacco heron, Ardeola ralloides
- Striated heron, Butorides striata (A)
- Black-crowned night-heron, Nycticorax nycticorax

== Ibises and spoonbills ==
Order: Pelecaniformes Family: Threskiornithidae

Threskiornithidae is a family of large terrestrial and wading birds which includes the ibises and spoonbills.

- Glossy ibis, Plegadis falcinellus
- Northern bald ibis, Geronticus eremita
- Eurasian spoonbill, Platalea leucorodia
- African spoonbill, Platalea alba (A)

== Osprey ==
Order: Accipitriformes Family: Pandionidae

The family Pandionidae contains only one species, the osprey, a medium large bird of prey with a worldwide distribution.

- Osprey, Pandion haliaetus

== Hawks, eagles, and kites ==
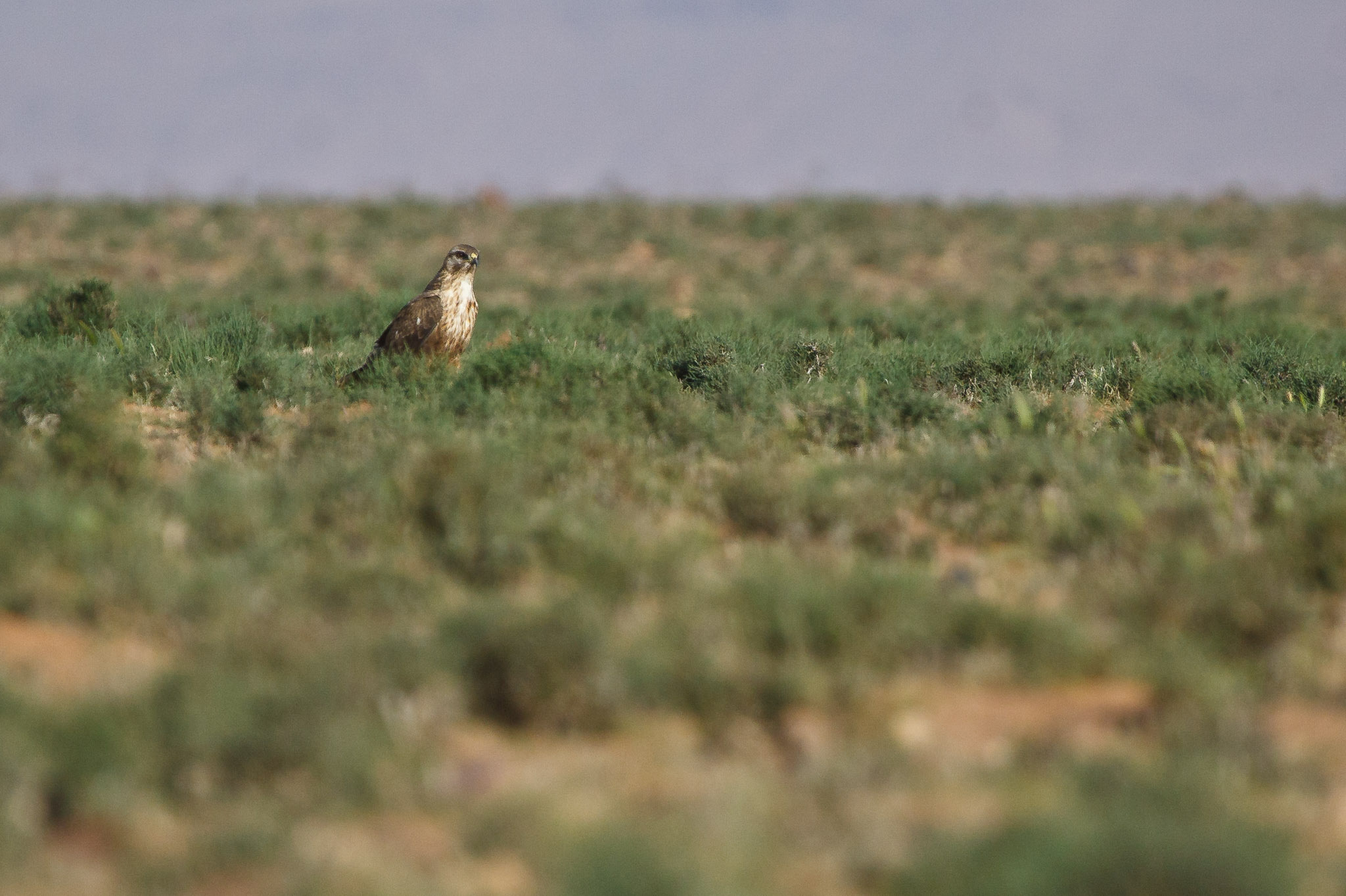
A long-legged buzzard in the Tagdelt desert

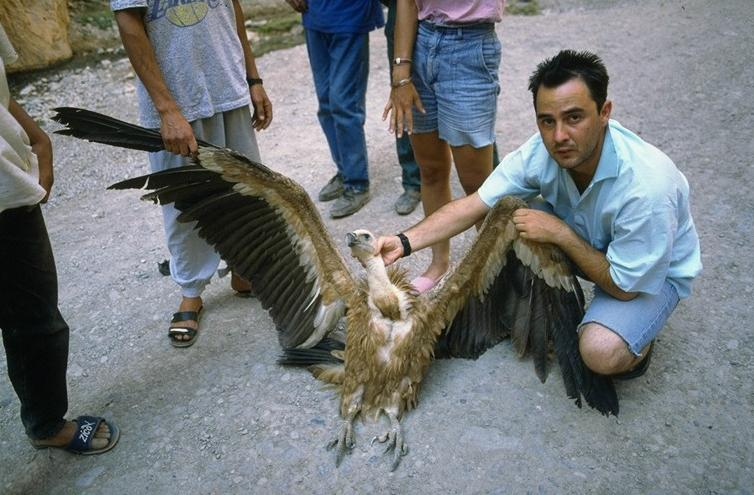
A Eurasian griffon in the Atlas Mountains

Order: Accipitriformes Family: Accipitridae

The Accipitridae is a family of birds of prey, which includes hawks, eagles, kites, harriers and Old World vultures. The bearded vulture, dark chanting-goshawk, and tawny eagle are all close to being extirpated in Morocco.

- Black-winged kite, Elanus caeruleus
- Bearded vulture, Gypaetus barbatus
- Egyptian vulture, Neophron percnopterus
- European honey-buzzard, Pernis apivorus
- Cinereous vulture, Aegypius monachus (A)
- Lappet-faced vulture, Torgos tracheliotos
- Hooded vulture, Necrosyrtes monachus (A)
- White-backed vulture, Gyps africanus (A)
- Rüppell's griffon, Gyps rueppelli (A)
- Eurasian griffon, Gyps fulvus
- Bateleur, Terathopius ecaudatus (A)
- Short-toed snake-eagle, Circaetus gallicus
- Lesser spotted eagle, Clanga pomarina (A)
- Greater spotted eagle, Clanga clanga (A)
- Booted eagle, Hieraaetus pennatus
- Tawny eagle, Aquila rapax
- Steppe eagle, Aquila nipalensis (A)
- Spanish eagle, Aquila adalberti (A)
- Golden eagle, Aquila chrysaetos
- Bonelli's eagle, Aquila fasciata
- Dark chanting-goshawk, Melierax metabates
- Eurasian marsh-harrier, Circus aeruginosus
- Hen harrier, Circus cyaneus
- Pallid harrier, Circus macrourus (A)
- Montagu's harrier, Circus pygargus
- Eurasian sparrowhawk, Accipiter nisus
- Levant sparrowhawk, Accipiter brevipes (A)
- Northern goshawk, Accipiter gentilis
- Red kite, Milvus milvus
- Black kite, Milvus migrans
- White-tailed eagle, Haliaeetus albicilla (A)
- Common buzzard, Buteo buteo
- Long-legged buzzard, Buteo rufinus

== Barn-owls ==
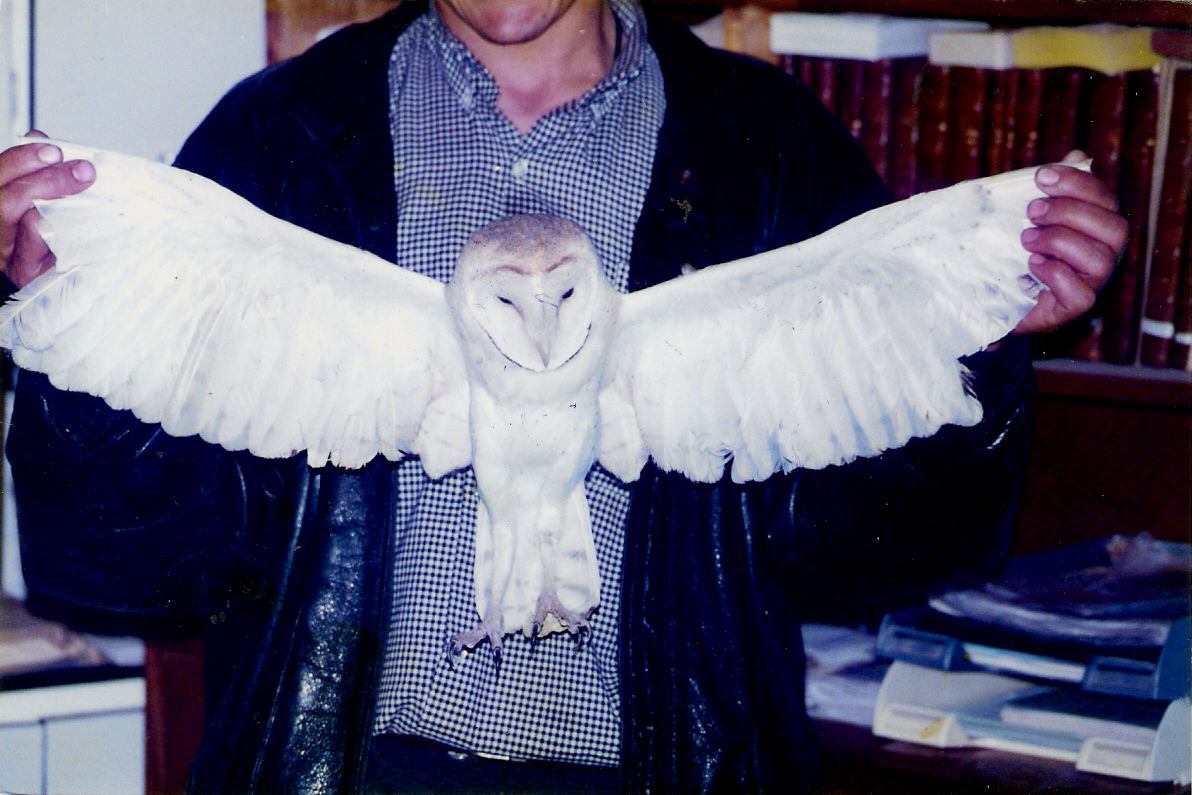
A barn owl in El Jadida

Order: Strigiformes Family: Tytonidae

Barn-owls are medium to large owls with large heads and characteristic heart-shaped faces. They have long strong legs with powerful talons.

- Western barn owl, Tyto alba

== Owls ==
Order: Strigiformes Family: Strigidae

The typical owls are small to large solitary nocturnal birds of prey.

- Eurasian scops-owl, Otus scops
- Eurasian eagle-owl, Bubo bubo (A)
- Pharaoh eagle-owl, Bubo ascalaphus
- Little owl, Athene noctua
- Maghreb owl, Strix mauritanica
- Long-eared owl, Asio otus
- Short-eared owl, Asio flammeus
- African wood owl, Strix woodfordii (A)
- Marsh owl, Asio capensis

== Hoopoes ==
Order: Bucerotiformes Family: Upupidae

Hoopoes have black, white, and orangey-pink colouring with a large erectile crest on their head.

- Eurasian hoopoe, Upupa epops

== Kingfishers ==
Order: Coraciiformes Family: Alcedinidae

Kingfishers are medium-sized birds with large heads, long pointed bills, short legs, and stubby tails.

- Common kingfisher, Alcedo atthis
- Pied kingfisher, Ceryle rudis (A)

== Bee-eaters ==
Order: Coraciiformes Family: Meropidae

The bee-eaters are a group of coraciiform birds in the family Meropidae. Most species are found in Africa but others occur in southern Europe, Madagascar, Australia, and New Guinea. They are characterised by richly coloured plumage, slender bodies, and usually elongated central tail feathers.

- White-throated bee-eater, Merops albicollis (A)
- Blue-cheeked bee-eater, Merops persicus
- European bee-eater, Merops apiaster

== Rollers ==
Order: Coraciiformes Family: Coraciidae

Rollers resemble crows in size and build, but are more closely related to the kingfishers and bee-eaters.

- European roller, Coracias garrulus
- Abyssinian roller, Coracias abyssinicus (A)

== Woodpeckers ==
Order: Piciformes Family: Picidae

Woodpeckers are small to medium-sized birds with chisel-like beaks, short legs, stiff tails, and long tongues.

- Eurasian wryneck, Jynx torquilla
- Great spotted woodpecker, Dendrocopos major
- Middle spotted woodpecker, Dendrocopos medius (A)
- Black woodpecker, Dryocopus martius (A)
- Levaillant's woodpecker, Picus vaillantii

== Falcons and caracaras ==
Order: Falconiformes Family: Falconidae

Falconidae is a family of diurnal birds of prey. They differ from hawks, eagles, and kites in that they kill with their beaks instead of their talons.

- Lesser kestrel, Falco naumanni
- Eurasian kestrel, Falco tinnunculus
- Fox kestrel, Falco alopex (A)
- Red-footed falcon, Falco vespertinus (A)
- Eleonora's falcon, Falco eleonorae
- Sooty falcon, Falco concolor (A)
- Merlin, Falco columbarius
- Eurasian hobby, Falco subbuteo
- Lanner falcon, Falco biarmicus
- Saker falcon, Falco cherrug (A)
- Peregrine falcon, Falco peregrinus

== Old World parrots ==
Order: Psittaciformes Family: Psittaculidae

Parrots are small to large birds with a characteristic curved beak shape.

- Rose-ringed parakeet, Psittacula krameri (A)

== New World and African parrots ==
Order: Psittaciformes Family: Psittacidae

Parrots are small to large birds with a characteristic curved beak. Their upper mandibles have slight mobility in the joint with the skull and they have a generally erect stance. All parrots are zygodactyl, having the four toes on each foot placed two at the front and two to the back.

- Monk parakeet, Myiopsitta monachus (A)

== Vireos ==
Order: Passeriformes Family: Vireonidae

The vireos are a group of small to medium-sized passerine birds. They are typically greenish in color and resemble wood warblers apart from their heavier bills.

- Red-eyed vireo, Vireo olivaceus (A)

== Old World orioles ==
Order: Passeriformes Family: Oriolidae

The Old World orioles are colourful passerine birds, not related to the New World orioles.

- Eurasian golden oriole, Oriolus oriolus

== Bushshrikes and allies ==
Order: Passeriformes Family: Malaconotidae

Bushshrikes are similar in habits to shrikes, hunting insects and other small prey from a perch on a bush.

- Black-crowned tchagra, Tchagra senegala

== Shrikes ==
Order: Passeriformes Family: Laniidae

Shrikes are passerine birds known for their habit of catching other birds and small animals and impaling the uneaten portions on thorns.

- Red-backed shrike, Lanius collurio (A)
- Isabelline shrike, Lanius isabellinus (A)
- Iberian gray shrike, Lanius meridionalis
- Great gray shrike, Lanius excubitor
- Masked shrike, Lanius nubicus (A)
- Woodchat shrike, Lanius senator

== Crows, jays, and magpies ==
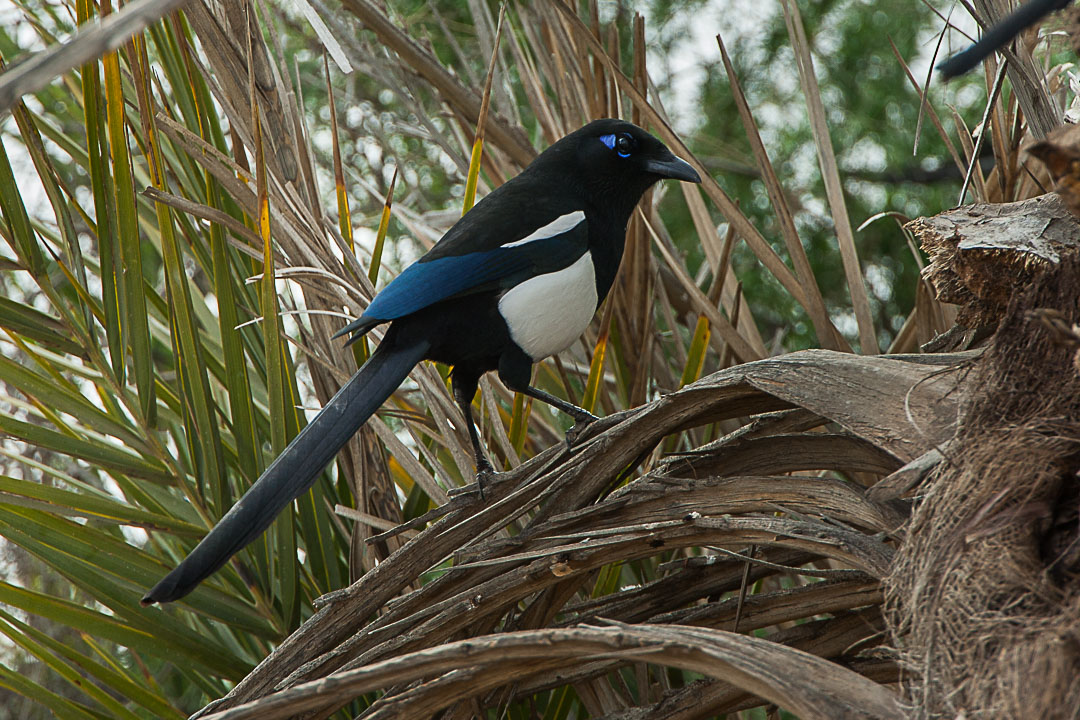
A Maghreb magpie in Agadir

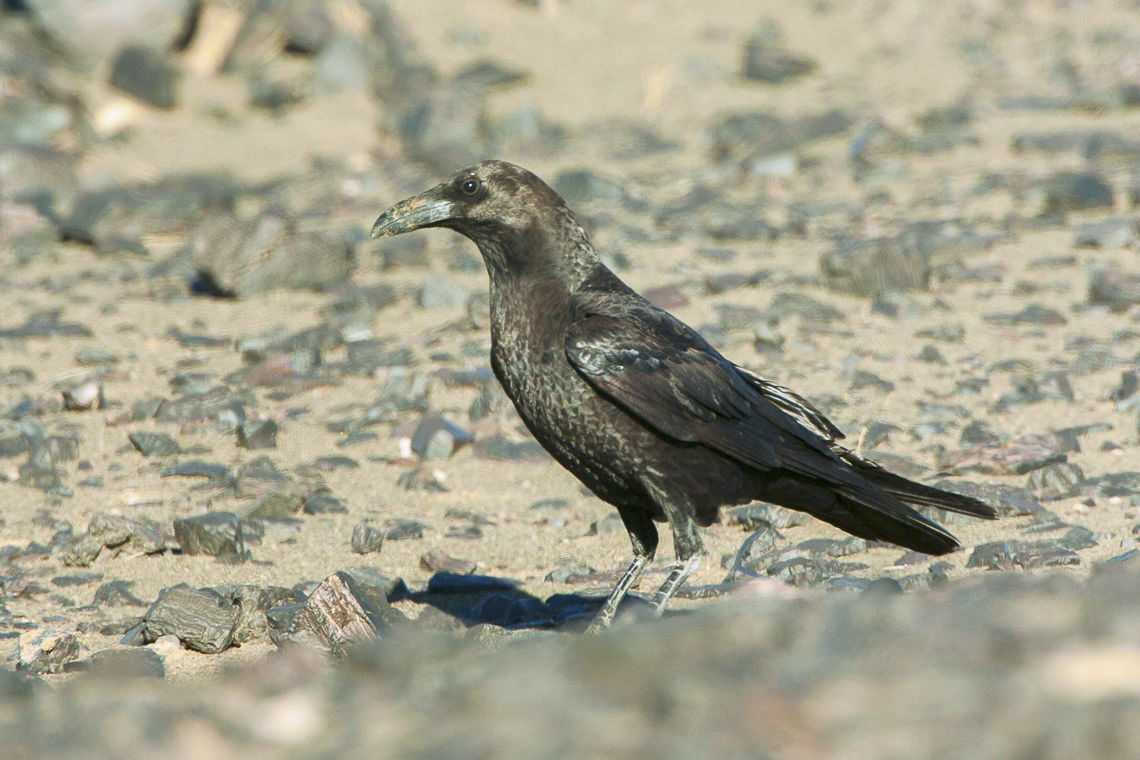
A brown-necked raven in Merzouga

Order: Passeriformes Family: Corvidae

The family Corvidae includes crows, ravens, jays, choughs, and magpies. Corvids are above average in size among the Passeriformes, and some of the larger species show high levels of intelligence.

- Eurasian jay, Garrulus glandarius
- Maghreb magpie, Pica mauritanica
- Eurasian magpie, Pica pica
- Red-billed chough, Pyrrhocorax pyrrhocorax
- Yellow-billed chough, Pyrrhocorax graculus
- Eurasian jackdaw, Corvus monedula
- House crow, Corvus splendens (A)
- Carrion crow, Corvus corone
- Hooded crow, Corvus cornix (A)
- Pied crow, Corvus albus (A)
- Brown-necked raven, Corvus ruficollis
- Common raven, Corvus corax

== Tits, chickadees, and titmice ==
Order: Passeriformes Family: Paridae

The Paridae are mainly small stocky woodland species with short stout bills.

- Coal tit, Periparus ater
- Marsh tit, Poecile palustris (A)
- Crested tit, Lophophanes cristatus (A)
- African blue tit, Cyanistes teneriffae
- Great tit, Parus major

== Penduline-tits ==
Order: Passeriformes Family: Remizidae

The penduline-tits are a group of small passerine birds related to the true tits.

- Eurasian penduline-tit, Remiz pendulinus (A)

== Larks ==
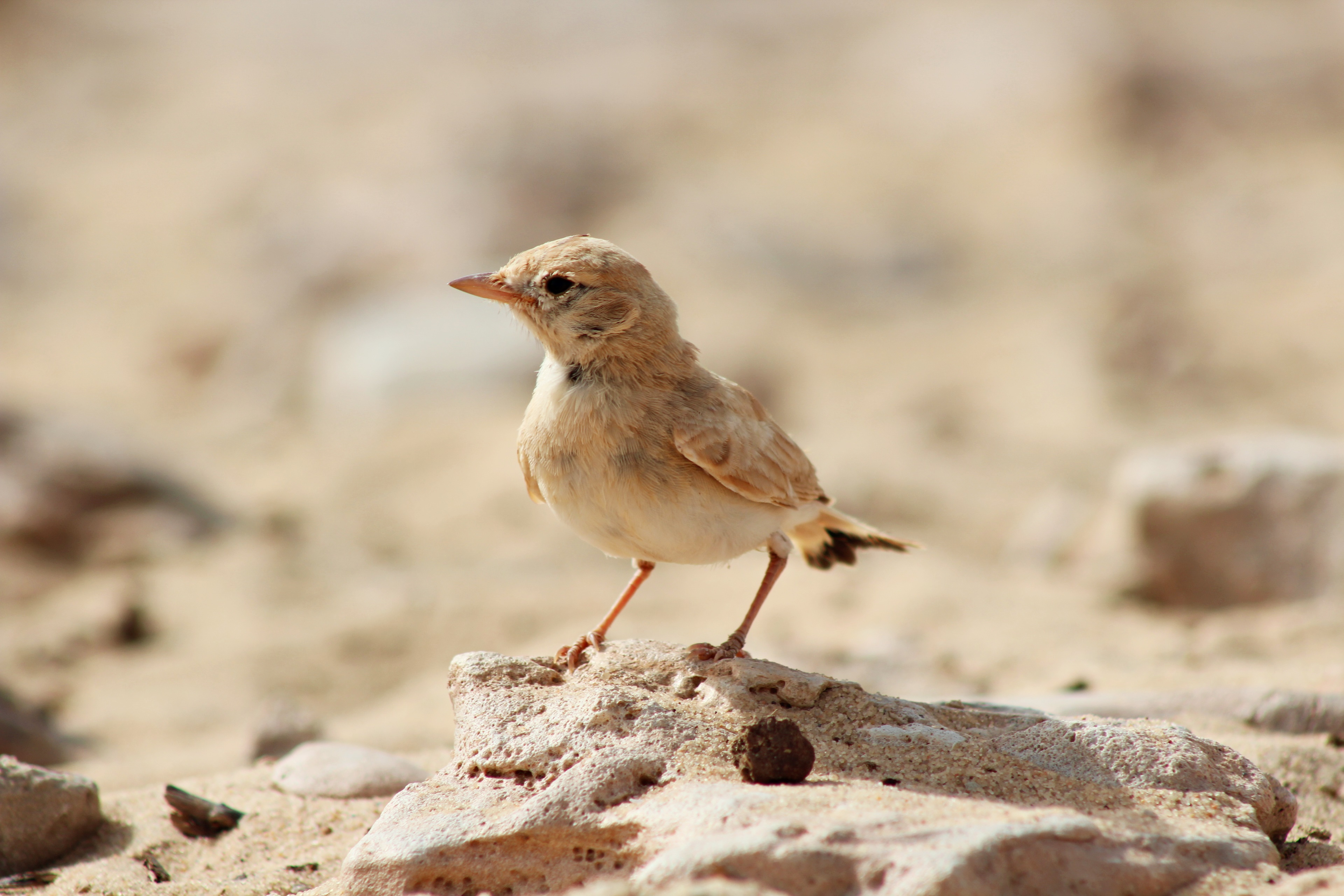
A Temminck's lark at Dakhla

Order: Passeriformes Family: Alaudidae

Larks are small terrestrial birds, mostly fairly dull in appearance.

- Greater hoopoe lark, Alaemon alaudipes
- Thick-billed lark, Ramphocoris clotbey
- Bar-tailed lark, Ammomanes cinctura
- Desert lark, Ammomanes deserti
- Black-crowned sparrow-lark, Eremopterix nigriceps
- Horned lark, Eremophila alpestris
- Temminck's lark, Eremophila bilopha
- Greater short-toed lark, Calandrella brachydactyla
- Calandra lark, Melanocorypha calandra
- Dupont's lark, Chersophilus duponti
- Dunn's lark, Eremalauda dunni
- Mediterranean short-toed lark, Alaudala rufescens
- Wood lark, Lullula arborea
- Eurasian skylark, Alauda arvensis
- Thekla's lark, Galerida theklae
- Crested lark, Galerida cristata

== Bearded reedling ==
Order: Passeriformes Family: Panuridae

The bearded reedling is a small bird found in reed beds across temperate Asia with smaller populations throughout Europe. It is the only member of its family.

- Bearded reedling, Panurus biarmicus (A)

== Cisticolas and allies ==
Order: Passeriformes Family: Cisticolidae

The Cisticolidae are warblers found mainly in warmer regions of the Old World.

- Cricket longtail, Spiloptila clamans
- Zitting cisticola, Cisticola juncidis

== Reed warblers and allies ==
Order: Passeriformes Family: Acrocephalidae

The members of this family are usually rather large for "warblers". Most are rather plain olivaceous brown above with much yellow to beige below. They are usually found in open woodland, reedbeds, or tall grass. The family occurs mostly in southern to western Eurasia and surroundings, but it also ranges far into the Pacific, with some species in Africa.

- Eastern olivaceous warbler, Iduna pallida
- Western olivaceous warbler, Iduna opaca
- Melodious warbler, Hippolais polyglotta
- Icterine warbler, Hippolais icterina (A)
- Aquatic warbler, Acrocephalus paludicola
- Moustached warbler, Acrocephalus melanopogon
- Sedge warbler, Acrocephalus schoenobaenus
- Marsh warbler, Acrocephalus palustris (A)
- Common reed warbler, Acrocephalus scirpaceus
- Great reed warbler, Acrocephalus arundinaceus

== Grassbirds and allies ==
Order: Passeriformes Family: Locustellidae

Locustellidae are a family of small insectivorous songbirds found mainly in Eurasia, Africa, and the Australian region. They are smallish birds with tails that are usually long and pointed, and tend to be drab brownish or buffy all over.

- Pallas's grasshopper warbler, Helopsaltes certhiola (A)
- River warbler, Locustella fluviatilis (A)
- Savi's warbler, Locustella luscinioides
- Common grasshopper-warbler, Locustella naevia

== Swallows ==
Order: Passeriformes Family: Hirundinidae

The family Hirundinidae is a group of passerines adapted to aerial feeding.

- Plain martin, Riparia paludicola
- Bank swallow, Riparia riparia
- Eurasian crag-martin, Ptyonoprogne rupestris
- Rock martin, Ptyonoprogne fuligula
- Barn swallow, Hirundo rustica
- Preuss's swallow, Petrochelidon preussi (A)
- Red-rumped swallow, Cecropis daurica
- Common house-martin, Delichon urbicum

== Bulbuls ==
Order: Passeriformes Family: Pycnonotidae

Bulbuls are medium-sized songbirds. Most are drab, with uniform olive-brown to black plumage.

- Common bulbul, Pycnonotus barbatus

== Leaf warblers ==
Order: Passeriformes Family: Phylloscopidae

Leaf warblers are a family of small insectivorous birds found mostly in Eurasia and ranging into Wallacea and Africa. The species are of various sizes, often green-plumaged above and yellow below, or more subdued with greyish-green to greyish-brown colors.

- Wood warbler, Phylloscopus sibilatrix
- Western Bonelli's warbler, Phylloscopus bonelli
- Yellow-browed warbler, Phylloscopus inornatus (A)
- Hume's warbler, Phylloscopus humei (A)
- Pallas's leaf warbler, Phylloscopus proregulus (A)
- Dusky warbler, Phylloscopus fuscatus (A)
- Willow warbler, Phylloscopus trochilus
- Common chiffchaff, Phylloscopus collybita
- Iberian chiffchaff, Phylloscopus ibericus
- Greenish warbler, Phylloscopus trochiloides (A)

== Bush warblers and allies ==
Order: Passeriformes Family: Scotocercidae

The members of this family are found throughout Africa, Asia, and Polynesia.

- Scrub warbler, Scotocerca inquieta
- Cetti's warbler, Cettia cetti

== Long-tailed tits ==
Order: Passeriformes Family: Aegithalidae

Long-tailed tits are a group of small passerine birds with medium to long tails.

- Long-tailed tit, Aegithalos caudatus (A)

== Sylviid warblers, parrotbills, and allies ==
Order: Passeriformes Family: Sylviidae

The family Sylviidae is a group of small insectivorous passerine birds. They mainly occur as breeding species, as the common name implies, in Europe, Asia, and, to a lesser extent, Africa. Most are of generally undistinguished appearance, but many have distinctive songs.

- Eurasian blackcap, Sylvia atricapilla
- Garden warbler, Sylvia borin
- Lesser whitethroat, Curruca curruca
- Western Orphean warbler, Curruca hortensis
- African desert warbler, Curruca deserti
- Tristram's warbler, Curruca deserticola
- Sardinian warbler, Curruca melanocephala
- Moltoni's warbler, Curruca subalpina (A)
- Western subalpine warbler, Curruca iberiae
- Eastern subalpine warbler, Curruca cantillans (A)
- Greater whitethroat, Curruca communis
- Spectacled warbler, Curruca conspicillata
- Marmora's warbler, Curruca sarda (A)
- Dartford warbler, Curruca undata

== Laughingthrushes and allies ==
Order: Passeriformes Family: Leiothrichidae

The members of this family are diverse in size and colouration, though those of genus Turdoides tend to be brown or greyish. The family is found in Africa, India, and southeast Asia.

- Fulvous chatterer, Argya fulva

== Kinglets ==
Order: Passeriformes Family: Regulidae

The kinglets and "crests" are a small family of birds which resemble some warblers. The adults have colored crowns, giving rise to their name.

- Goldcrest, Regulus regulus (A)
- Common firecrest, Regulus ignicapillus

== Wallcreeper ==
Order: Passeriformes Family: Tichodromidae

The wallcreeper is a small bird, with crimson, grey, and black plumage, related to the nuthatches.

- Wallcreeper, Tichodroma muraria (A)

== Nuthatches ==
Order: Passeriformes Family: Sittidae

Nuthatches are small woodland birds.

- Eurasian nuthatch, Sitta europaea

== Treecreepers ==
Order: Passeriformes Family: Certhiidae

Treecreepers are small woodland birds, brown above and white below.

- Short-toed treecreeper, Certhia brachydactyla

== Wrens ==
Order: Passeriformes Family: Troglodytidae

The wrens have short wings and thin down-turned bills.

- Eurasian wren, Troglodytes troglodytes

== Dippers ==
Order: Passeriformes Family: Cinclidae

Dippers are a group of perching birds which specialise in feeding in running water.

- White-throated dipper, Cinclus cinclus

== Starlings ==
Order: Passeriformes Family: Sturnidae

Starlings are small to medium-sized passerine birds.

- European starling, Sturnus vulgaris
- Spotless starling, Sturnus unicolor
- Rosy starling, Pastor roseus (A)

== Thrushes and allies ==
Order: Passeriformes Family: Turdidae

The thrushes are a group of passerine birds that occur mainly but not exclusively in the Old World. They are plump, soft plumaged, small to medium-sized insectivores or sometimes omnivores, often feeding on the ground. Many have attractive songs.

- Mistle thrush, Turdus viscivorus
- Song thrush, Turdus philomelos
- Redwing, Turdus iliacus
- Eurasian blackbird, Turdus merula
- Eyebrowed thrush, Turdus obscurus (A)
- African thrush, Turdus pelios (A)
- Fieldfare, Turdus pilaris (A)
- Ring ouzel, Turdus torquatus

== Old World flycatchers ==
Order: Passeriformes Family: Muscicapidae

Old World flycatchers are a large group of small passerine birds native to the Old World. They are mainly small arboreal insectivores. The appearance of these birds is highly varied, but they mostly have weak songs and harsh calls.

- Spotted flycatcher, Muscicapa striata
- Rufous-tailed scrub-robin, Cercotrichas galactotes
- European robin, Erithacus rubecula
- Common nightingale, Luscinia megarhynchos
- Bluethroat, Luscinia svecica
- Red-breasted flycatcher, Ficedula parva (A)
- European pied flycatcher, Ficedula hypoleuca (A)
- Semi-collared flycatcher, Ficedula semitorquata (A)
- Atlas flycatcher, Ficedula speculigera
- Collared flycatcher, Ficedula albicollis (A)
- Moussier's redstart, Phoenicurus moussieri
- Common redstart, Phoenicurus phoenicurus
- Black redstart, Phoenicurus ochruros
- Rufous-tailed rock-thrush, Monticola saxatilis
- Blue rock-thrush, Monticola solitarius
- Whinchat, Saxicola rubetra
- European stonechat, Saxicola rubicola
- Siberian stonechat, Saxicola maurus (A)
- Northern wheatear, Oenanthe oenanthe
- Atlas wheatear, Oenanthe seebohmi
- Isabelline wheatear, Oenanthe isabellina
- Desert wheatear, Oenanthe deserti
- Western black-eared wheatear, Oenanthe hispanica
- Eastern black-eared wheatear, Oenanthe melanoleuca (A)
- Red-rumped wheatear, Oenanthe moesta
- Black wheatear, Oenanthe leucura
- White-crowned wheatear, Oenanthe leucopyga
- Mourning wheatear, Oenanthe halophila

== Waxbills and allies ==
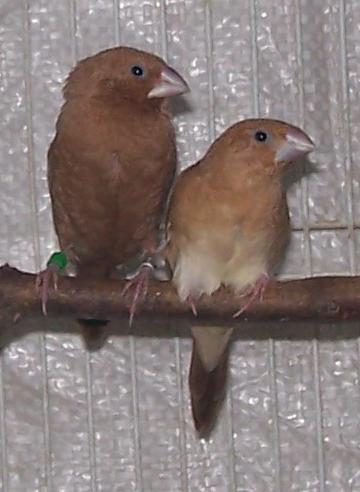
African silverbill

Order: Passeriformes Family: Estrildidae

The estrildid finches are small passerine birds of the Old World tropics and Australasia. They are gregarious and often colonial seed eaters with short thick but pointed bills. They are all similar in structure and habits, but have wide variation in plumage colours and patterns.

- Red-billed firefinch, Lagonosticta senegala (A)

== Accentors ==
Order: Passeriformes Family: Prunellidae

The accentors are in the only bird family which is completely endemic to the Palearctic.

- Alpine accentor, Prunella collaris
- Dunnock, Prunella modularis

== Old World sparrows ==
Order: Passeriformes Family: Passeridae

In general, sparrows tend to be small, plump, brown or grey birds with short tails and short powerful beaks. Sparrows are seed eaters, but they also consume small insects.

- House sparrow, Passer domesticus
- Spanish sparrow, Passer hispaniolensis
- Desert sparrow, Passer simplex
- Eurasian tree sparrow, Passer montanus
- Sudan golden sparrow, Passer luteus (A)
- Rock sparrow, Petronia petronia
- White-winged snowfinch, Montifringilla nivalis (A)

== Wagtails and pipits ==
Order: Passeriformes Family: Motacillidae

The Motacillidae is a family of small passerine birds with medium to long tails. They are slender ground-feeding insectivores of open country.

- Gray wagtail, Motacilla cinerea
- Western yellow wagtail, Motacilla flava
- Citrine wagtail, Motacilla citreola (A)
- White wagtail, Motacilla alba
- Richard's pipit, Anthus richardi (A)
- Tawny pipit, Anthus campestris
- Meadow pipit, Anthus pratensis
- Tree pipit, Anthus trivialis
- Olive-backed pipit, Anthus hodgsoni (A)
- Red-throated pipit, Anthus cervinus
- Plain-backed pipit, Anthus leucophrys (A)
- Water pipit, Anthus spinoletta
- Rock pipit, Anthus petrosus (A)
- American pipit, Anthus rubescens (A)

== Finches, euphonias, and allies ==
Order: Passeriformes Family: Fringillidae

Finches are seed-eating passerine birds that are small to moderately large and have a strong beak, usually conical and in some species very large. These birds have a bouncing flight with alternating bouts of flapping and gliding on closed wings, and most sing well.

- Common chaffinch, Fringilla coelebs
- Brambling, Fringilla montifringilla
- Hawfinch, Coccothraustes coccothraustes
- Common rosefinch, Carpodacus erythrinus (A)
- Eurasian bullfinch, Pyrrhula pyrrhula (A)
- Crimson-winged finch, Rhodopechys sanguineus
- Trumpeter finch, Bucanetes githaginea
- European greenfinch, Chloris chloris
- Eurasian linnet, Linaria cannabina
- Common redpoll, Acanthis flammea (A)
- Lesser redpoll, Acanthis cabaret (A)
- Red crossbill, Loxia curvirostra
- European goldfinch, Carduelis carduelis
- Citril finch, Carduelis citrinella (A)
- Island canary, Serinus canaria (A)
- European serin, Serinus serinus
- Eurasian siskin, Spinus spinus

== Snow buntings and longspurs ==
Order: Passeriformes Family: Calcariidae

The Calcariidae are a group of passerine birds that had been traditionally grouped with the New World sparrows, but differ in a number of respects and are usually found in open grassy areas.

- Snow bunting, Plectrophenax nivalis (A)
- Lapland longspur, Calcarius lapponicus (A)

== Old World buntings ==
Order: Passeriformes Family: Emberizidae

Emberizidae are a large family of passerine birds. They are seed-eating birds with distinctively shaped bills. Many emberizid species have distinctive head patterns.

- Black-headed bunting, Emberiza melanocephala (A)
- Corn bunting, Emberiza calandra
- Rock bunting, Emberiza cia
- Cirl bunting, Emberiza cirlus
- Yellowhammer, Emberiza citrinella (A)
- Ortolan bunting, Emberiza hortulana
- House bunting, Emberiza sahari
- Reed bunting, Emberiza schoeniclus
- Little bunting, Emberiza pusilla (A)

== Globally and locally extinct ==
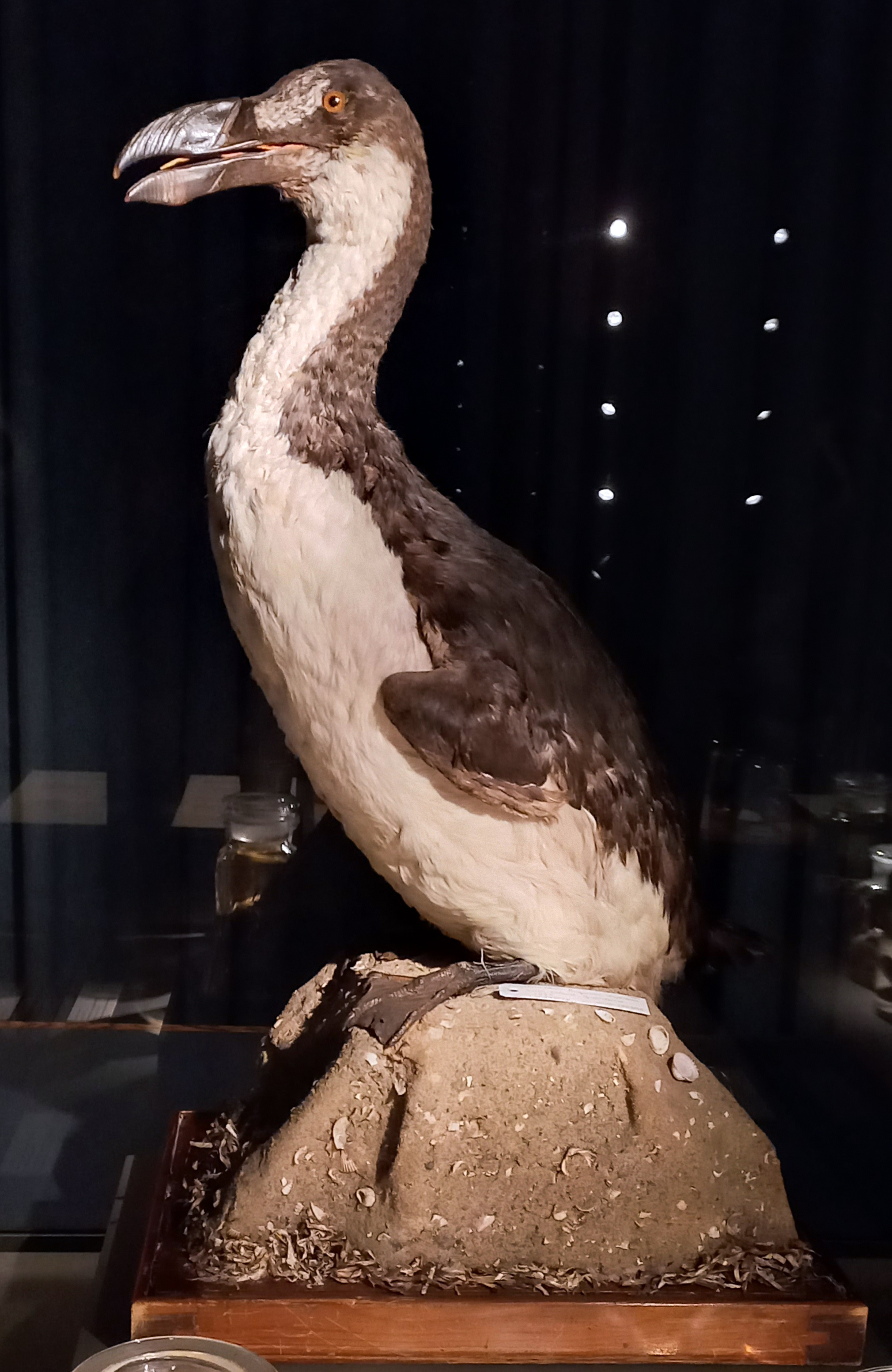
Great auk

The following species are globally extinct:

- Great auk, Pinguinus impennis EX (1852)
- Slender-billed curlew, Numenius tenuirostris EX (1995)

The following species are locally extinct in Morocco, but continue to exist elsewhere

- Arabian bustard, Ardeotis arabs lynesi NT
- Demoiselle crane, Grus virgo LC

== See also ==
- List of birds
- Lists of birds by region
