= Alan Harris (illustrator) =

British bird illustrator (born 1957)

Alan John Harris (born 10 April 1957) is a British bird illustrator.

== Life ==
Harris was born in Epping, Essex. As a teenager, he became active in bird ringing, and in 1978 he became a member of Rye Meads bird ringing group.

After receiving his Bachelor of Arts in Graphic Design from Middlesex Polytechnic in 1980, he began his career as a freelance bird illustrator. In 1982 he was elected Bird Artist of the Year by bird journal British Birds. Since 1988 he has been a member of the artistic staff of this magazine. In 1989 he was a jury member of the competition Bird Artist of the Year.

For his illustrations Harris undertook numerous field studies, which led him chiefly to the Mediterranean and the Middle East. Influenced by Charles Tunnicliffe, Robert Gillmor, Peter Hayman, David Morrison Reid Henry, Robert Bateman and Lars Jonsson, he makes his drawings with watercolors, gouache and acrylic. He is also an admirer of the bird illustrator David Quinn.

== Works ==
In addition to numerous illustrations in British Birds and other magazines, Harris has illustrated the following books:

- Pete Tate, Swallows (1981)
- John Gooders, A Field Guide to the Birds of Britain and Europe (1986)
- Keith Vinicombe and Laurel Tucker, The Macmillan Guide to Bird Identification
- James Hancock, Storks, Ibises and Spoonbills of the World (1992)
- Kathie Fry and C. Hilary Fry, Kingfishers, Bee-eaters and Rollers (1992)
- Peter Clement and John Davis, Finches and Sparrows: An Identification Guide (1993)
- Hadoram Shirihai and David A. Christie, The Macmillan Birders' Guide to European and Middle Eastern Birds (1996).

In addition, from 1988 to 1993 he served on the team of illustrators for volumes 5 to 7 of the standard work Handbook of the Birds of Europe, the Middle East and North Africa by Stanley Cramp.

== Sources ==
- John E. Pemberton. Who's Who in Ornithology. Buckingham Press, 1997. ISBN 978-0-9514965-8-9, p. 169
- Nicholas Hammond. Modern wildlife painting. Pica Press, 1998. ISBN 187-340-355-0: p. 229
