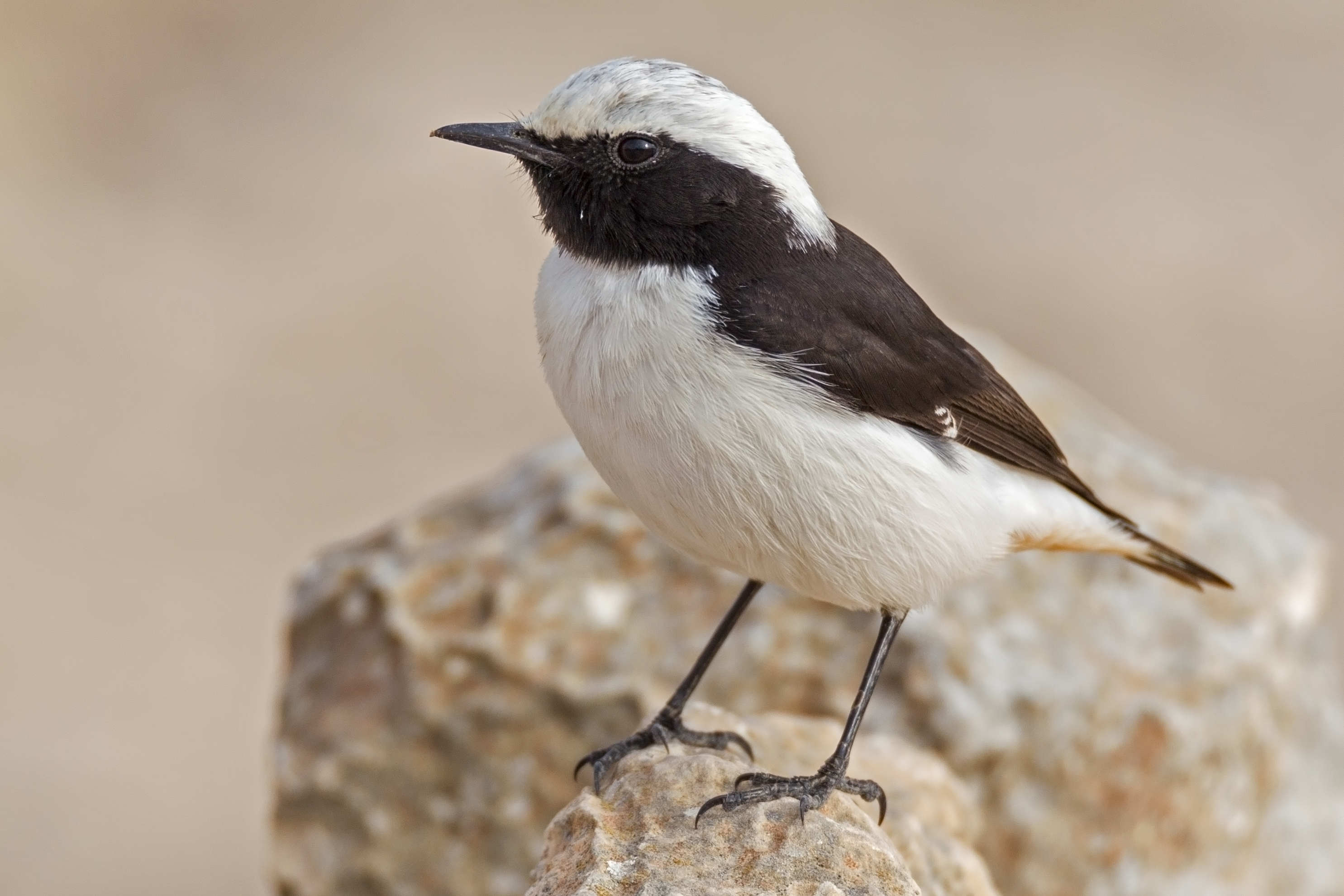
- In Negev Desert, Israel

Conservation status
- Least Concern (IUCN 3.1)

Scientific classification
- Kingdom: Animalia
- Phylum: Chordata
- Class: Aves
- Order: Passeriformes
- Family: Muscicapidae
- Genus: Oenanthe
- Species: O. lugens

Binomial name
- Oenanthe lugens (Lichtenstein, MHC, 1823)

= Mourning wheatear =

Species of bird

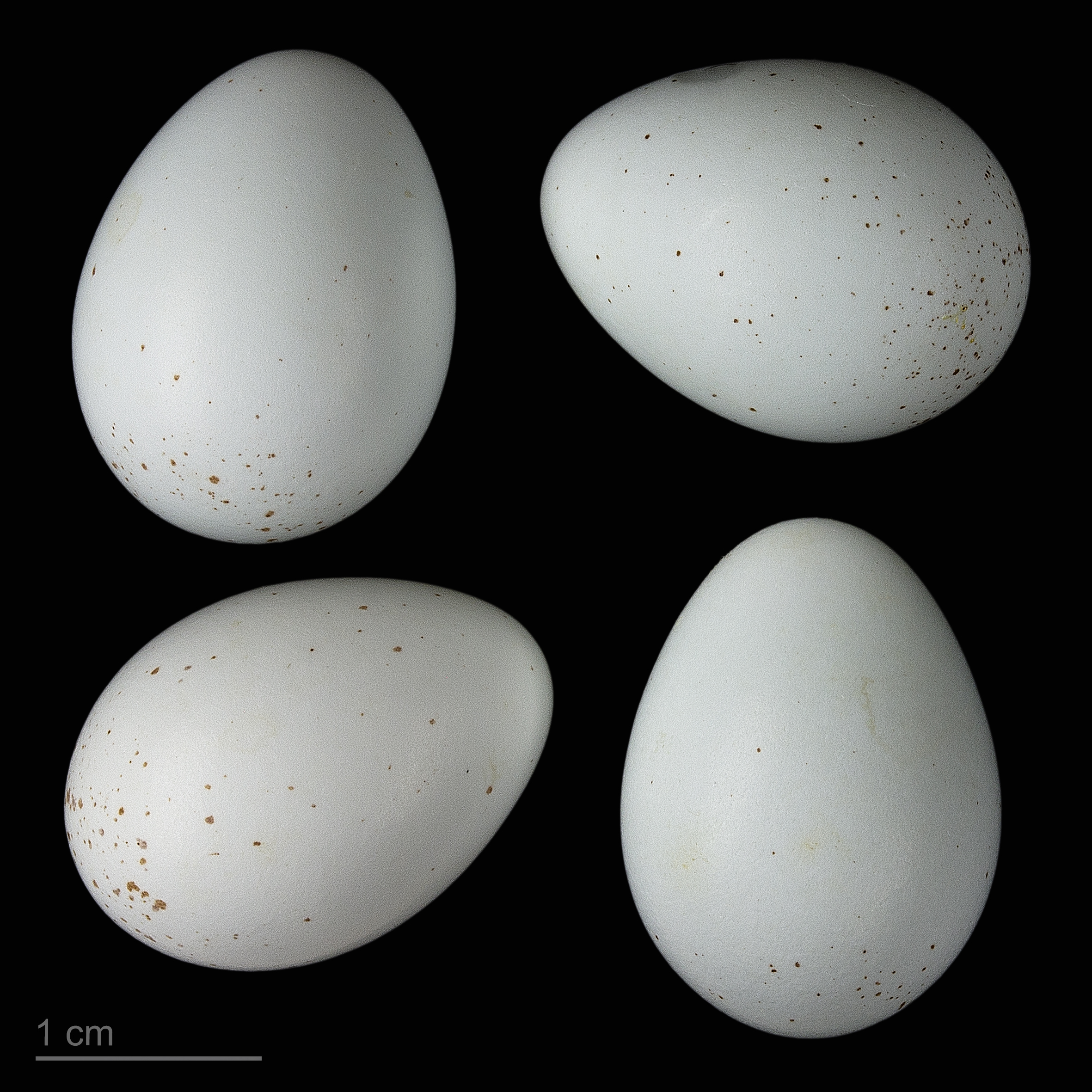
Oenanthe lugens lugens - MHNT

The mourning wheatear (Oenanthe lugens) is a bird, one of 14 species of wheatear found in northern Africa and the Middle East. It is a small passerine in a group formerly classed as members of the thrush family Turdidae, but now more generally considered to be part of the Old World flycatcher family Muscicapidae.

== Taxonomy ==
The mourning wheatear was formally described in 1823 as Saxicola lugens by the German naturalist Hinrich Lichtenstein based on a specimen collected in Nubia. The specific epithet is from Latin lugens, lugentis meaning "mourning". The mourning wheatear is now one of around thirty wheatears placed in the genus Oenanthe that was introduced in 1816 by the French ornithologist Louis Pierre Vieillot.

Four subspecies are recognised.

- O. l. halophila (Tristram, HB, 1859) – northern Sahara (eastern Morocco to northern Libya and northwestern Egypt)
- O. l. lugens (Lichtenstein, MHC, 1823) – Egypt (east of the Nile) to Israel, Syria, Jordan, and northern Iraq
- O. l. persica (Seebohm, H, 1881) – breeds southern Iran; wanders to southern Egypt, northern Sudan, and southern Israel
- O. l. warriae Shirihai, H & Kirwan, GM, 2011 – basalt desert of eastern Jordan and southern Syria

The subspecies O. l. halophila has sometimes been treated as a separate species, the Maghreb wheatear, and the subspecies O. l. warriae has also sometimes been treated as a separate species, the basalt wheatear. As the differences in mitochondrial DNA sequences are relatively modest, the two taxa are treated by AviList as subspecies.

== Description ==
The mourning wheatear measures 14–16 cm (5.5–6.3 in) in length and weighs between 19–25 g (0.67–0.88 oz). It is characterised by its striking black-and-white plumage. Both males and females share a similar appearance, featuring a white crown, nape, chest, and belly that contrast with the black head and neck, which extend to the black back. The tail is predominantly white, marked by a black stripe at the tip and a central black intrusion forming an inverted "T" pattern, a characteristic feature of wheatears. While the wings appear entirely black when at rest, they reveal white bases on the flight feathers during flight, creating a distinct white "flag" along the wing. It shows only a subtle sexual dimorphism, with the females sporting more subtle plumage. The basalt wheatear, subspecies O. l. warriae, differs from the nominate is having mainly black plumage except for white undertail coverts and a small white patch on the rump. The plumage of the adult female is less black and more brown in colour. The Maghreb wheatear, subspecies O. l. halophila, shows strong sexual dimorphism with the female having grey-brown plumage rather than the black and white of the male.

== Distribution and habitat ==
The mourning wheatear is native to semi-desert areas of the Middle East, from eastern Egypt to Iran, and with O. l. halophila disjunct from Morocco to northwestern Egypt. It is primarily found in desert habitats, favouring environments with caves for shelter, rocky slopes, valleys, screes, cliffs, ravines, dry barren wadis, ridges, and flat plains. It occasionally visits villages, lowlands, wastelands, and cultivated fields. The species is typically observed at altitudes ranging from 1,000 to 4,000 metres (3,300 to 13,100 ft).

== Conservation status ==
The species has a wide distribution range, stable population trends, and is presumed to have a large population, although precise estimates have not been conducted. As a result, it is classified as "Least Concern" by the International Union for Conservation of Nature (IUCN).

== Gallery ==
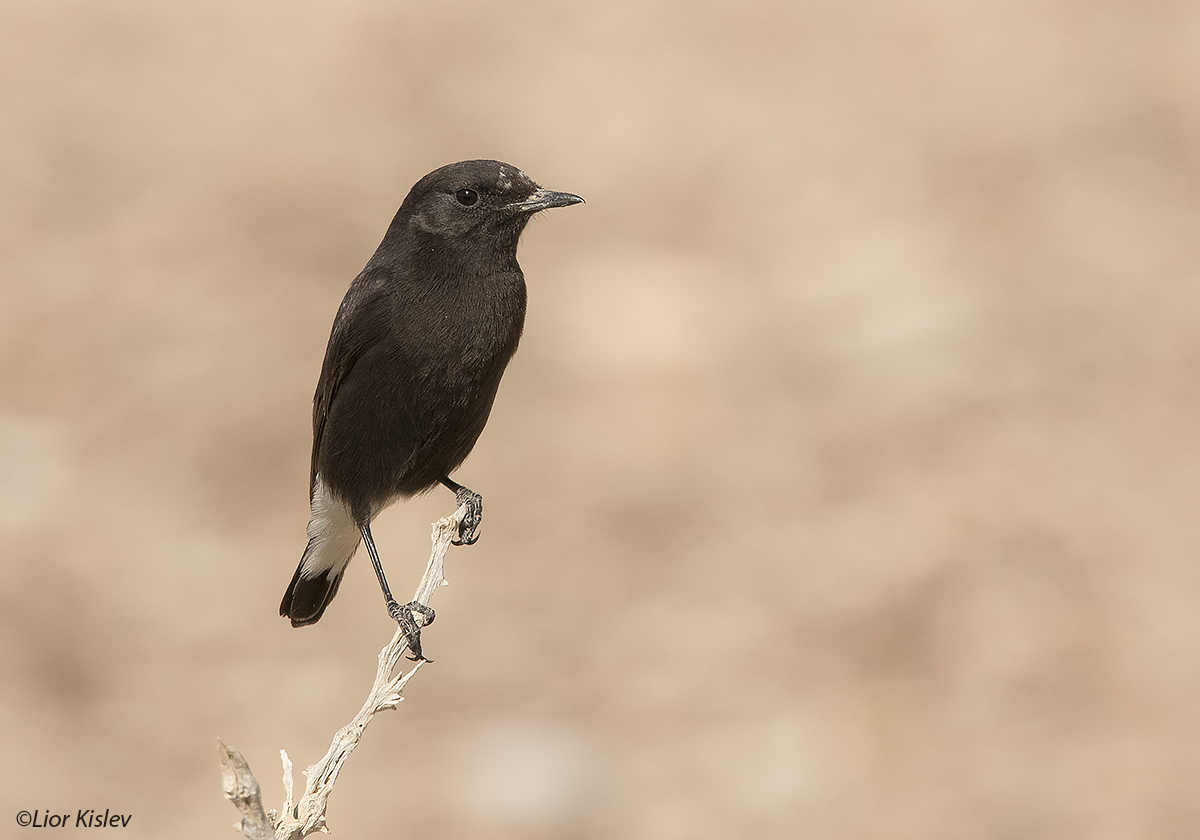
Basalt wheatear (O. l. warriae), Arabah, Israel

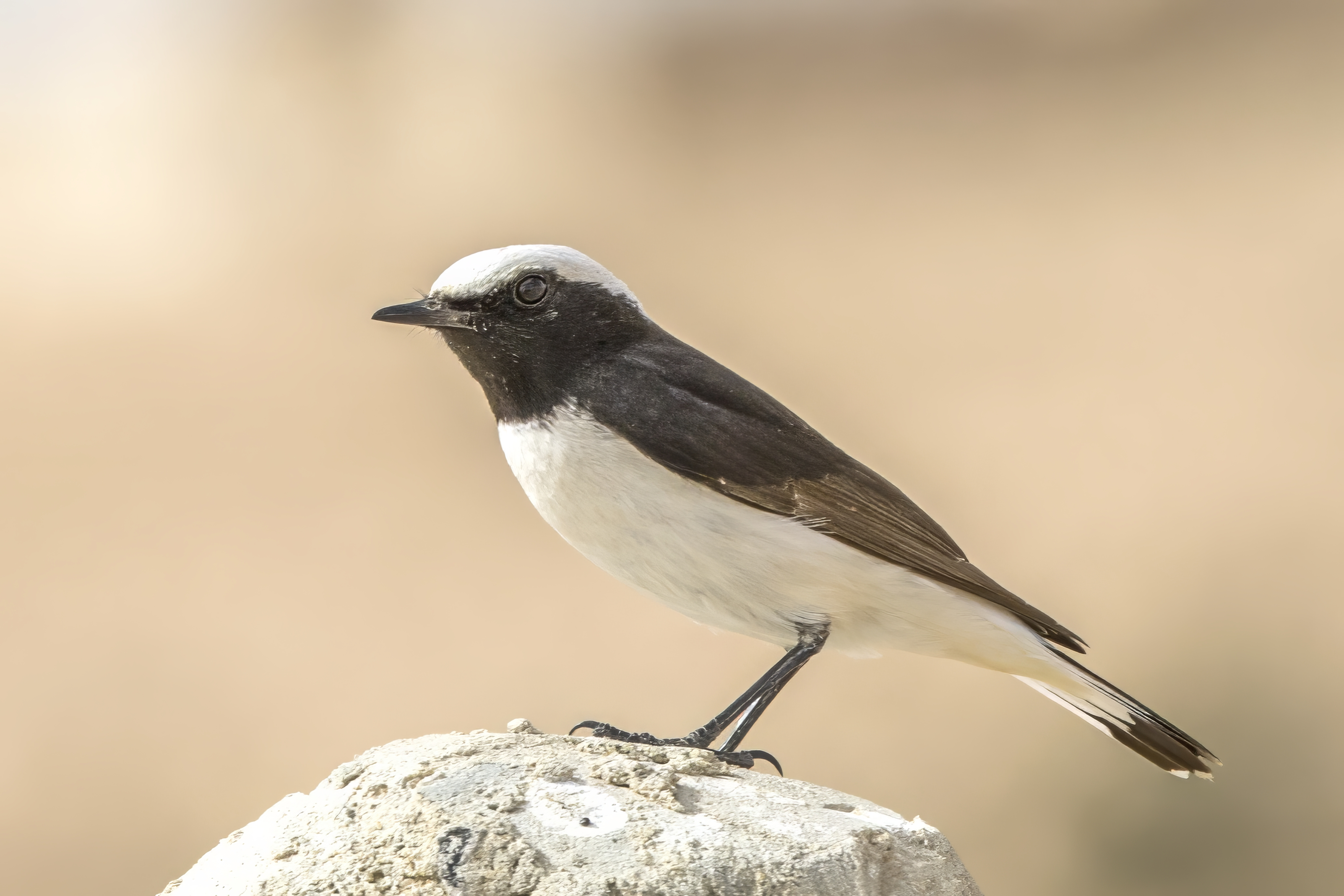
Maghreb wheatear (O. l. halophila), Tunisia
