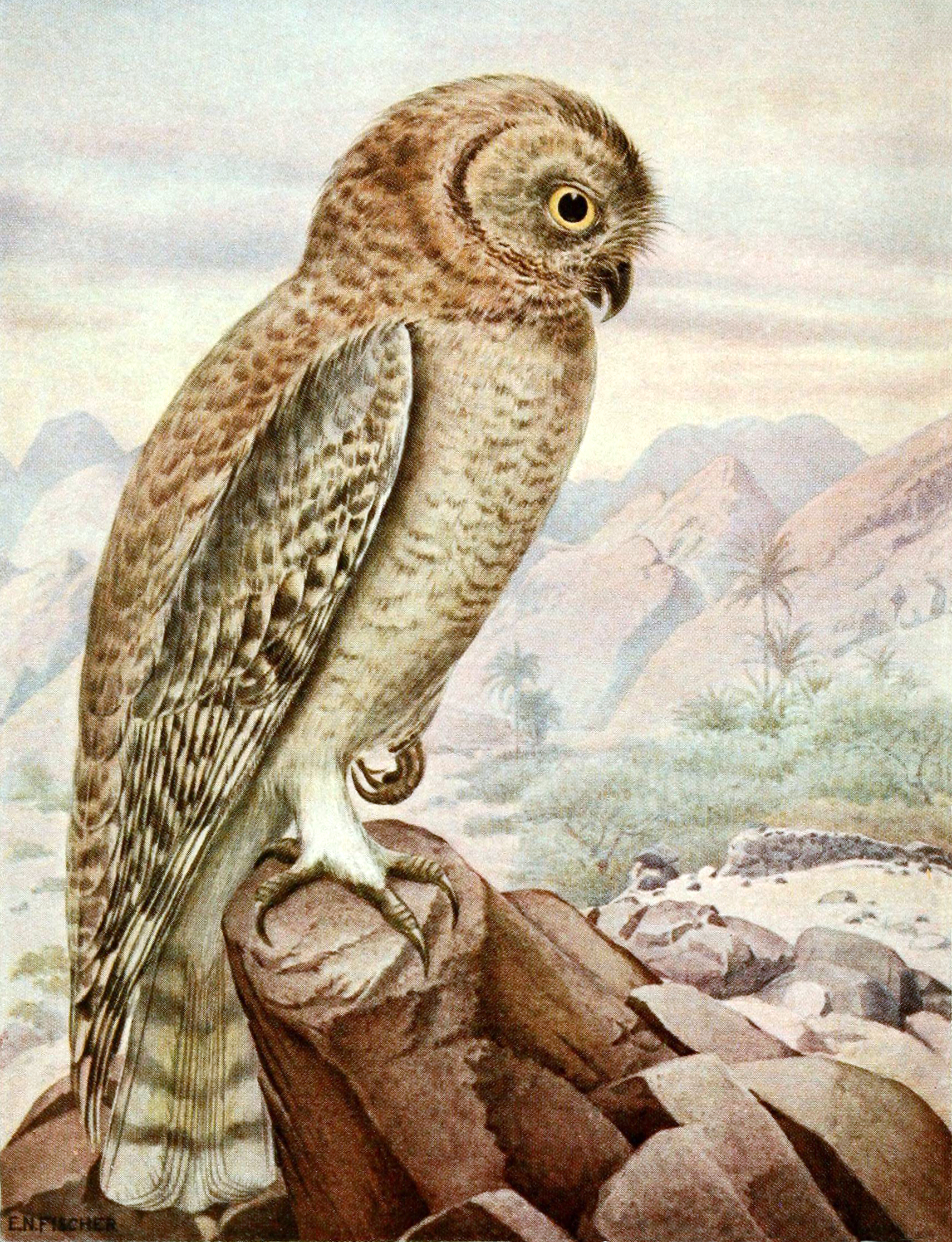

Conservation status
- Least Concern (IUCN 3.1)
- CITES Appendix II

Scientific classification
- Kingdom: Animalia
- Phylum: Chordata
- Class: Aves
- Order: Strigiformes
- Family: Strigidae
- Genus: Strix
- Species: S. butleri

Binomial name
- Strix butleri (Hume, 1878)

Synonyms
- Strix omanensis Robb, van den Berg & Constantine, 2013

= Omani owl =

Species of owl

The Omani owl (Strix butleri) is an owl of the genus Strix found in shrubland and rocky areas of Oman, Iran and the United Arab Emirates. It was discovered in 2013.

After the distinctive Omani owl was discovered, a similar-looking owl was reclassified from "Hume's owl" (Strix butleri) to the "desert owl" (Strix hadorami).

== Original discovery ==
The holotype of Strix butleri was collected by the English ornithologist Colonel Edward Arthur Butler. Butler sent the holotype to Allan Octavian Hume, who described it in 1878, commemorating Butler with its scientific name. Hume was commemorated in the common name of the species before 2015 taxonomic revision. Over the following century, similar owls seen, heard and collected in the Middle East were presumed to belong to the same species, but this was shown in 2015 to be incorrect.

== Rediscovery and taxonomic revision ==
In 2013, Robb et al. discovered a previously unknown population of Strix owl in Oman, morphologically and vocally different from the widespread Middle Eastern species of owl known at the time as Hume's owl Strix butleri. They described this owl as a new species, giving it the binomial Strix omanensis and the common name Omani owl. It was described only from photographs and sound recordings, without a physical specimen or genetic sample.

In 2015, analysis of the holotype of Strix butleri revealed that it was quite different from other specimens from throughout the Middle East presumed to be of the same species, and that it was more similar to the Omani owl; the authors concluded that Strix omanensis is most probably a synonym of Strix butleri, and renamed the more widespread species Strix hadorami, giving it the new common name desert tawny owl (subsequently shortened to desert owl by some authors).

== Conservation status ==
The IUCN lists Strix omanensis (now considered a synonym of Strix butleri) as data deficient. (The IUCN's evaluation for Strix butleri predates taxonomic changes, so now more properly applies to the desert owl, Strix hadorami).

== Description ==
The Omani owl has a bi-coloured pale and dark grey face with orange eyes, dark greyish brown upperparts, pale underparts with long, narrow vertical dark streaks, relatively long legs, banded wings, and a banded tail.

== Habitat ==
The Omani owl has been observed in high rocky cliffs, but not in nearby wadis.

== See also ==
- Desert owl
