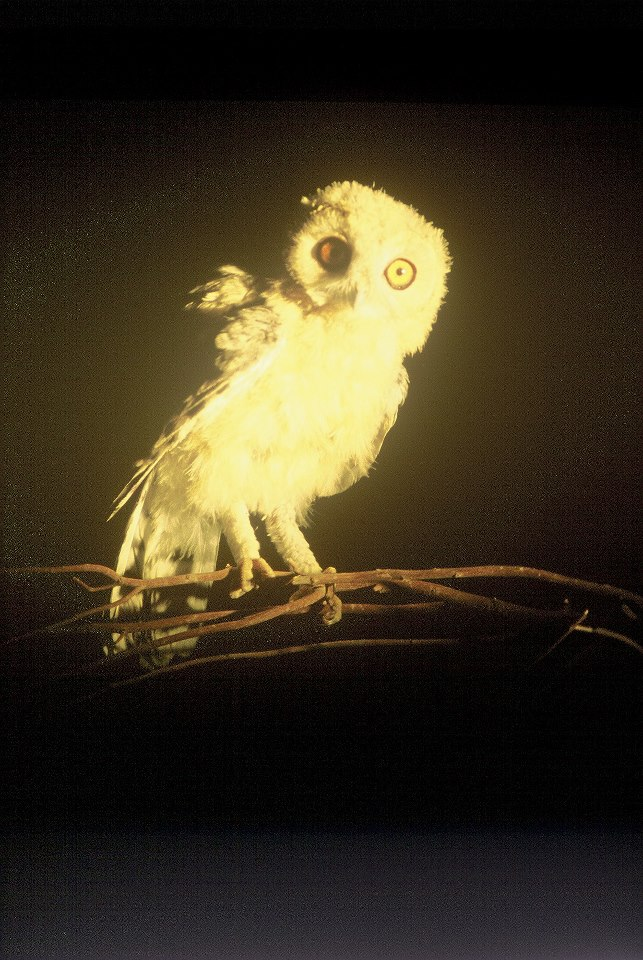

Conservation status
- Least Concern (IUCN 3.1)
- CITES Appendix II (CITES)

Scientific classification
- Kingdom: Animalia
- Phylum: Chordata
- Class: Aves
- Order: Strigiformes
- Family: Strigidae
- Genus: Strix
- Species: S. hadorami

Binomial name
- Strix hadorami Kirwan, Schweizer & Copete, 2015

= Desert owl =

Species of owl

The desert owl or desert tawny owl (Strix hadorami), formerly known as Hume's owl, is a species of owl. It is closely related to the more widespread tawny owl and to the range-restricted Omani owl.

This species is a part of the family Strigidae, commonly known as typical owls, which contains most species of owl. The other owl family is the barn owls, Tytonidae.

The desert owl breeds in Israel, northeast Egypt, Jordan, and the Arabian Peninsula. Its habitat includes desert, semi-desert, rocky ravines, and palm groves. It nests in crevices and holes in cliffs. Its diet consists of voles, mice and large insects.

This is a medium-sized earless owl, smaller than the tawny owl at 29–33 cm in length. It is largely nocturnal and sedentary. Its stocky body and round head recall a small tawny owl, but it is paler, less streaked, particularly on the underparts, and has yellow eyes.

The call of the desert owl is a hoooo-ho-ho-ho-ho, described as similar in rhythm to Eurasian collared dove. The call of females is deeper and less distinct than the call of males.

== Taxonomy ==
This species was known for over a century by the scientific name Strix butleri, but a 2015 study demonstrated that the holotype of S. butleri was not actually a member of this species, but was instead most likely an Omani owl (which had been described as a new species, S. omanensis, in 2013). Because the allocation of Strix butleri to the Omani owl left the more widespread species without a name, the authors of the study named it S. hadorami after Israeli ornithologist Hadoram Shirihai, and gave it the new common name desert tawny owl (which has been subsequently shortened to desert owl by some authors).

== See also ==
- Omani owl
