= The Macmillan Field Guides to Bird Identification =

Two bird field guides

The Macmillan Field Guides to Bird Identification are two small bird field guides. Volume 1, The Macmillan Field Guide to Bird Identification, illustrated by Alan Harris and Laurel Tucker, with text by Keith Vinicombe, was originally published in 1989, covered British birds. Volume 2, The Macmillan Birder's Guide to European and Middle Eastern Birds, illustrated by Alan Harris, with text by Hadoram Shirihai and David Christie, covered birds of continental Europe and the Middle East, and was published in 1996.

The guides adopt an unusual format, in that not all species in the geographical area of coverage are included; instead only groups of species which the authors regarded as difficult to identify are covered. Each such group is given a chapter, where identification is covered discursively rather than in the abbreviated form more usually used in a field guide. The publication of the first volume (covering Britain and Ireland) was the first time that this approach had been used in a European guide

The first volume is widely credited as having a major influence on improving the identification skills of birders in Britain during the 1990s.
