= Hadoram Shirihai =

Israeli ornithologist and writer (born 1962)

Hadoram Shirihai (Hebrew: הדורם שיריחי; born in Israel 1962) is an Israeli ornithologist and writer.

== Biography ==
Shirihai is the son of Batia and Eli Shirihai. His mother was a schoolteacher, his father was a zoologist in Israel. He grew up in Jerusalem where he became fascinated with birds when he was 13 and spent much time documenting shorebird behaviour, raptor breeding biology and participating in bird migration surveys. In the 1980s and 1990s, he lived in Eilat on Israel's Red Sea coast, where he founded the International Birdwatching Center, becoming its first director.

== Scientific career ==
Shirihai was behind the discovery of several new species in the Western Palearctic and Israel. He guided birding trips into the southern Negev desert, showing many observers locally breeding Hume's tawny owl and Nubian nightjar among other little-watched species of the area. He has written a number of bird identification papers, mostly published in English in magazines such as British Birds and Birding World. With David Christie, he co-wrote the Macmillan Birder's Guide to European and Middle Eastern birds among several other works.

Shirihai is a consummate birder, having added 50 previously undocumented new bird species to the List of birds of Israel, and 10 new species to the Western Palearctic list of birds.

In January 2015, a newly described owl species, Strix hadorami, was named after Shirihai by Dr. Manuel Schweizer and colleagues.

== Published works ==
He is the author of The Birds of Israel and co-author of a definitive work on the genus Sylvia. He serves as an editorial consultant to leading bird magazines in Europe such as Dutch Birding and Birdwatch.

Hadoram's main sphere of interest was the complex geographical variation shown by birds breeding in and migrating through the Middle East. He extended his research to Europe, northeast Africa and Asia, publishing The Photographic Handbook for Western Palearctic Birds (Shirihai & Svensson) and The Handbook for Geographical Variation of Palearctic Birds (Roselaar & Shirihai).

In the mid-1990s, Shirihai turned his attention to oceanic birds and marine mammals, particularly those of the Southern Hemisphere. He published The Complete Guide to Antarctic Wildlife, and commenced a 10-year project to produce the Photographic Handbook of Birds of the World.

Shirihai has visited almost every subantarctic island and the breeding grounds of all forms of albatrosses, with special interest in plumage variation and identification. In 2008, he confirmed the continuing existence of the mysterious Beck's petrel (Pseudobulweria becki), known until then from 2 specimens collected in the 1920s and a handful of tentative sight records.

== Published works ==
- Shirihai, H. (1996) The Birds of Israel. Academic Press, London.
- Shirihai, H., Christie, D. A. & Harris, A. (1996) The Macmillan birder’s guide to European and Middle Eastern birds. Macmillan, London.
- Shirihai, H., Yosef, R., Alon, D. & Kirwan, G. (2000) Raptor migration in Israel and the Middle East. A summary of 30 years of field research. IBRCE, IOC, SPNI, Eilat.
- Shirihai, H., Smith, J., Kirwan, G. & Alon, D. (2000) A guide to the birding hot spots of Israel. Israel Ornithological Center, SPNI, Tel Aviv.
- Shirihai, H., Gargallo, G. & Helbig, A. J. (Ill. by A. Harris & D. Cottridge) (2001) Sylvia Warblers. A. & C. Black, London.
- Shirihai, H. (Ill. by B. Jarrett) (2002) A complete guide to Antarctic wildlife: the birds and marine mammals of the Antarctic continent and the Southern Ocean. Princeton University Press.
- Shirihai, H. (Ill. by B. Jarrett) (2006) Whales, dolphins and seals. A field guide to the marine mammals of the world. A. & C. Black, London.

== See also ==
- Wildlife of Israel
- Hula Valley
