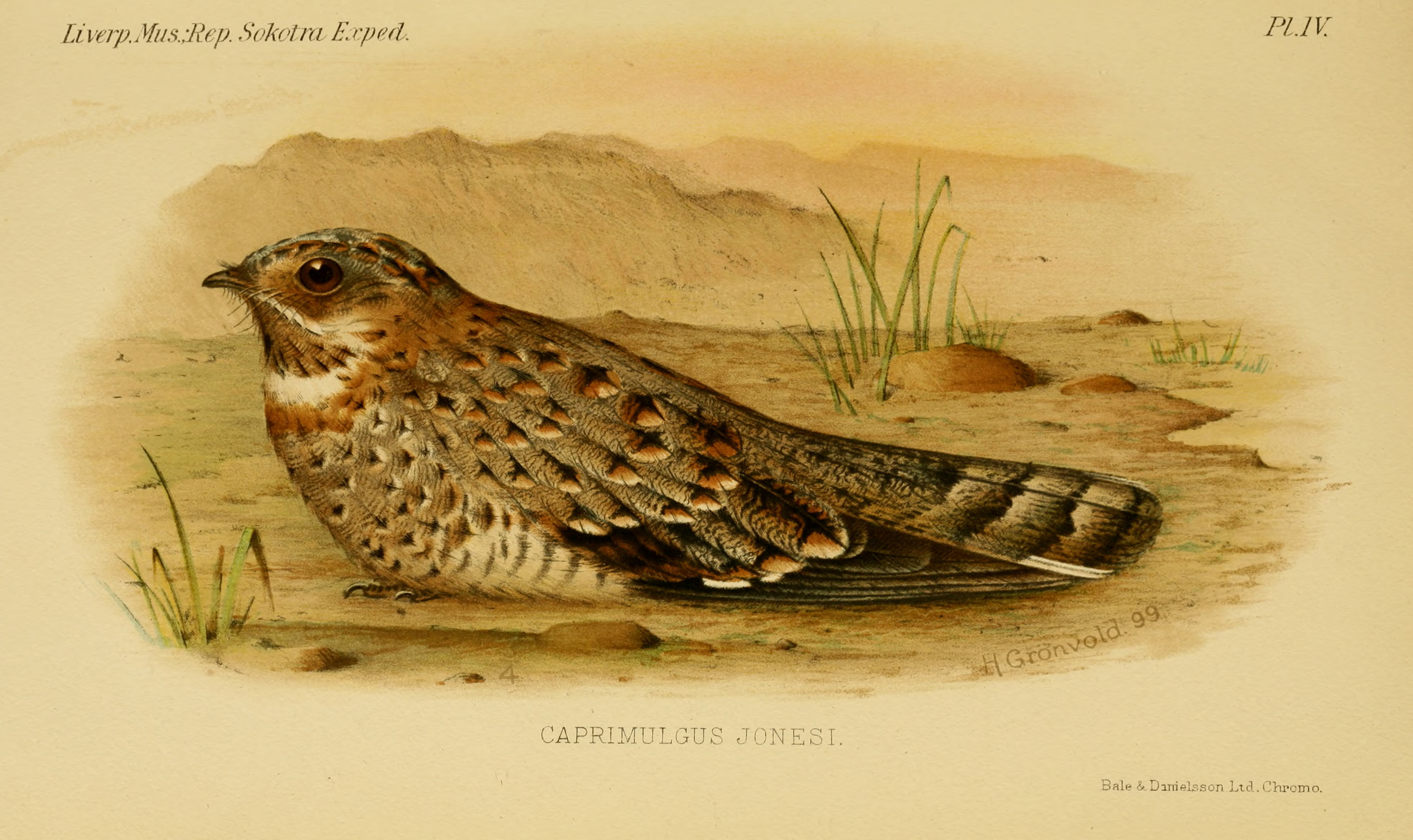
- Illustration by Henrik Grönvold of the subspecies jonesi

Conservation status
- Least Concern (IUCN 3.1)

Scientific classification
- Kingdom: Animalia
- Phylum: Chordata
- Class: Aves
- Order: Caprimulgiformes
- Family: Caprimulgidae
- Genus: Caprimulgus
- Species: C. nubicus

Binomial name
- Caprimulgus nubicus Lichtenstein, MHC, 1823

= Nubian nightjar =

Species of bird

The Nubian nightjar (Caprimulgus nubicus) is a species of nightjar in the family Caprimulgidae. It is found in salt marshes of Djibouti, Egypt, Eritrea, Ethiopia, Israel, Kenya, Oman, Saudi Arabia, Somalia, Sudan, and Yemen.

== Description ==
The Nubian nightjar is 20–22 cm (7.9–8.7 in) long. It is a nocturnal species, known for its large eyes and beak, which help it hunt at night. The bird resembles the Moorish nightjar, but is smaller, has a shorter tail and blunt wings compared to the Moorish nightjar. Another characteristic feature is a red-brown band over the neck. The white wing spots are not further away from the wing tips than other types of nightjars.

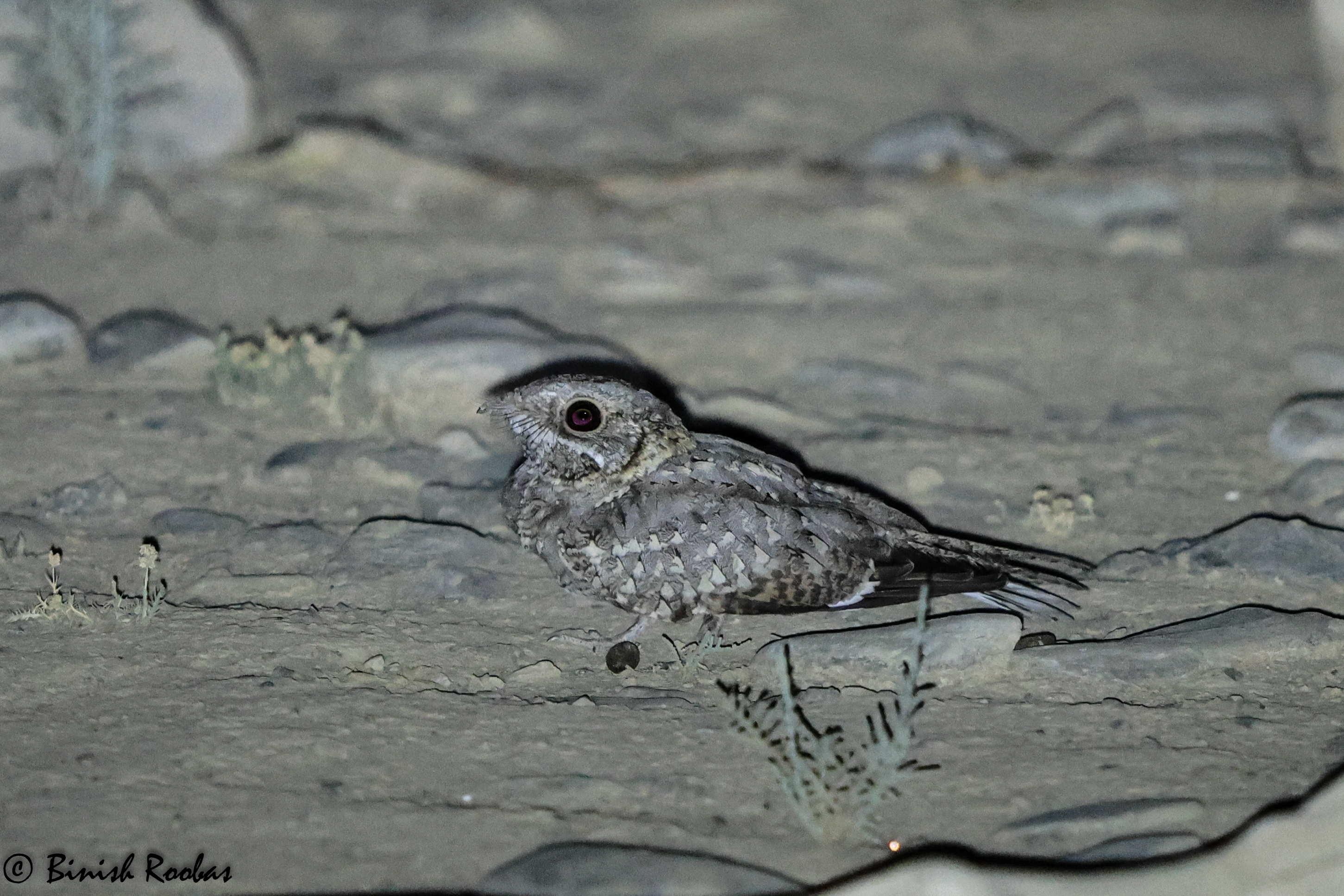
In Saudi Arabia

== Nesting ==
Like other nightjars, the Nubian nightjar nests on the ground. Its nests are clustered in small groups of 1 to 3. It is hypothesized to prefer to nest near agricultural areas for greater access to food.
