= Keith Vinicombe =

British ornithologist & writer

Keith E. Vinicombe is a British ornithologist and writer on bird identification.

Vinicombe is best known for his first book, the Macmillan Field Guide to Bird Identification. Subsequent publications include Rare Birds in Britain and Ireland - a photographic record, co-authored with David Cottridge, in which Vinicombe set out to explain theories about bird vagrancy in Britain and western Europe, including reverse migration. He is identification consultant to Birdwatch magazine, and has written extensively on bird identification in Birdwatch, and other British journals, including Birding World and British Birds.

He has served on both the British Birds Rarities Committee and the British Ornithologists' Union Records Committee. His regular birding patch is Chew Valley Lake, where he has found numerous rare birds. Elsewhere in Avon, he is responsible for finding nine county firsts. Elsewhere in Britain, his finds include Britain's second ring-billed gull and the first lesser scaup and Blyth's reed warbler for the Isles of Scilly. He was also among the observers who confirmed the identification of Britain's only Mediterranean short-toed lark, at Portland Bill in 1992.

Vinicombe has also studied the status of vagrant wildfowl in Britain and northwest Europe, in particular that of ruddy shelduck and white-headed duck. A paper on the former species (co-authored with Andrew Harrop) was published in British Birds in 1999.

Vinicombe and the bird artist Laurel Tucker were personal and professional partners for a period during the 1980s, until Tucker's death in 1986.

== Major publications ==
- Vinicombe, Keith (2020). John Rossetti (ed.). Birds of Chew Valley Lake: Ecology, History, Tales. Keith Vinicombe (privately published). p. 468p. ISBN 9781527263680.
- Vinicombe, Keith; Alan Harris; Laurel Tucker (1989). The Macmillan field guide to bird identification. London: Macmillan. p. 224p. ISBN 0-333-42773-4.
- Vinicombe, Keith; David Cottridge (1996). Rare birds in Britain and Ireland a photographic record. London: Collins. pp. 192p., 96p. of col. plates : ill., maps, 24 cm. ISBN 0-00-219976-9.
- Vinicombe, Keith; Harrop, Andrew (1999). "Ruddy Shelducks in Britain and Ireland 1986-1994". British Birds. 92: 225–255.
