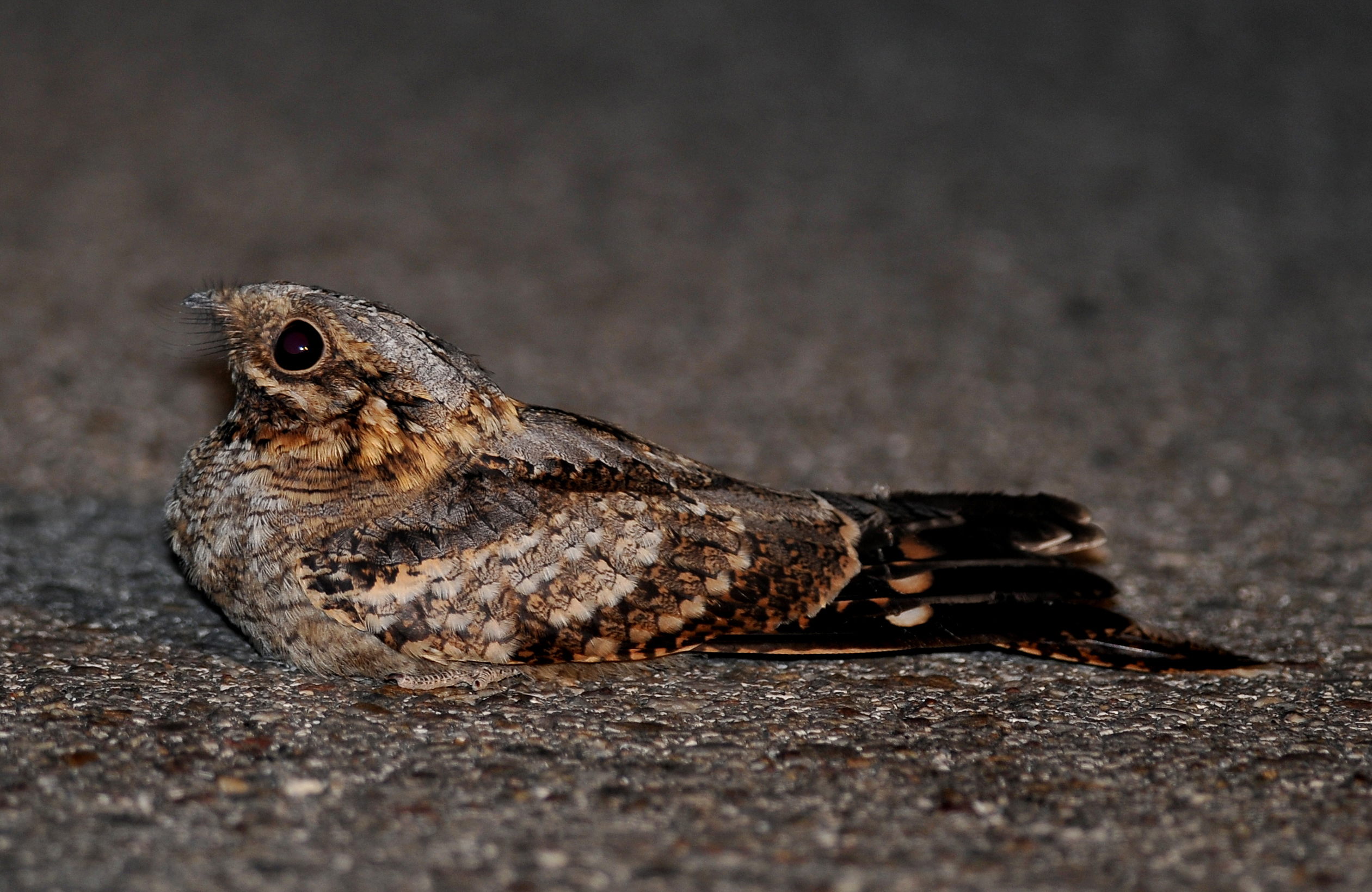
- In Portugal

Conservation status
- Near Threatened (IUCN 3.1)

Scientific classification
- Kingdom: Animalia
- Phylum: Chordata
- Class: Aves
- Clade: Strisores
- Order: Caprimulgiformes
- Family: Caprimulgidae
- Genus: Caprimulgus
- Species: C. ruficollis

Binomial name
- Caprimulgus ruficollis Temminck, 1820
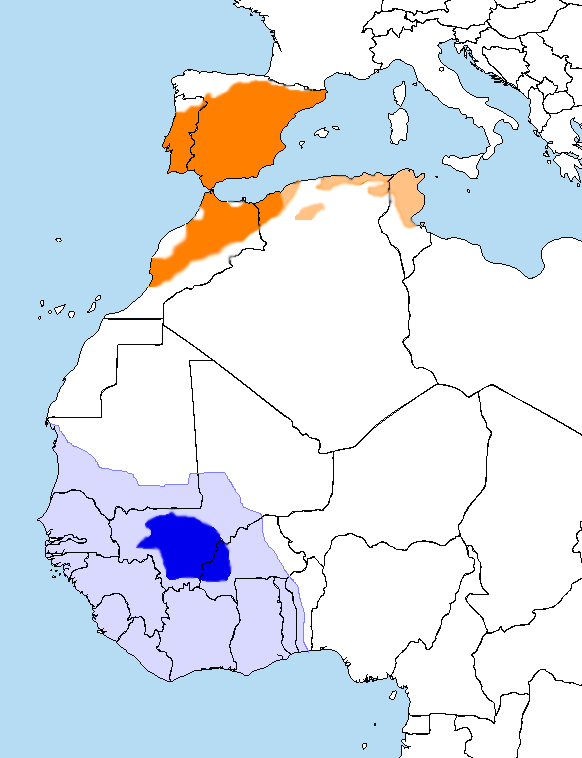
- Distribution breeding winter

Audio
- Call in Saint-Martin-des-Lais, France

= Red-necked nightjar =

Species of bird

The red-necked nightjar (Caprimulgus ruficollis) is the largest of the nightjars occurring in Europe. It breeds in Iberia and North Africa, and winters in tropical West Africa.

== Taxonomy ==
Caprimulgus is derived from the Latin capra, "nanny goat", and mulgere, "to milk", referring to an old myth that nightjars suck milk from goats. The specific ruficollis is from Latin rufus, "red", and collum, "neck".

The common name "nightjar", first recorded in 1630, refers to the nocturnal habits of the bird, the second part of the name deriving from the distinctive churring song.

There are two subspecies: nominate ruficollis, breeding in Iberia, and desertorum breeding in North Africa. The North African form desertorum is paler than the Iberian one, and has different patterning on the base of its primary feathers: dark and orange bands of approximately equal width, compared to the narrower orange bands and greater extent of black of ruficollis.

== Description ==
The variegated plumage resembles the European nightjar. The adult is lichen-grey, barred and streaked with buff, chestnut and black. The underparts are barred. It is larger and longer-tailed than the more widespread species, and has a rufous neck-collar. Both sexes have white wing spots, tail sides and throat. During the day this nightjar lies silent upon the ground, concealed by its plumage; it is difficult to detect, looking like a bit of lichen-covered twig or a fragment of bark. The length is 32 cm, and the wingspan 64 cm. Like other nightjars, it has a wide gape, long wings, soft downy plumage and nocturnal habits.

=== Call ===
Its call is a repetitive mechanical kyok-kyok-kyok..., which rises and falls as the bird turns its head from side to side. When it churrs, the bird lies or crouches along a branch or rail, but it will sing from a post. During courtship, and occasionally at other times, it uses a mechanical signal, a sharp cracking sound, caused by clapping the wings together over the back.

== Habitat ==
Open sandy heaths with trees or bushes are the haunts of this crepuscular nightjar. It flies at dusk, most often at sundown, with an easy, silent moth-like flight; its strong and deliberate wingbeats alternate with graceful sweeps and wheels with motionless wings. Crepuscular insects, such as moths, are its food.

== Nesting ==
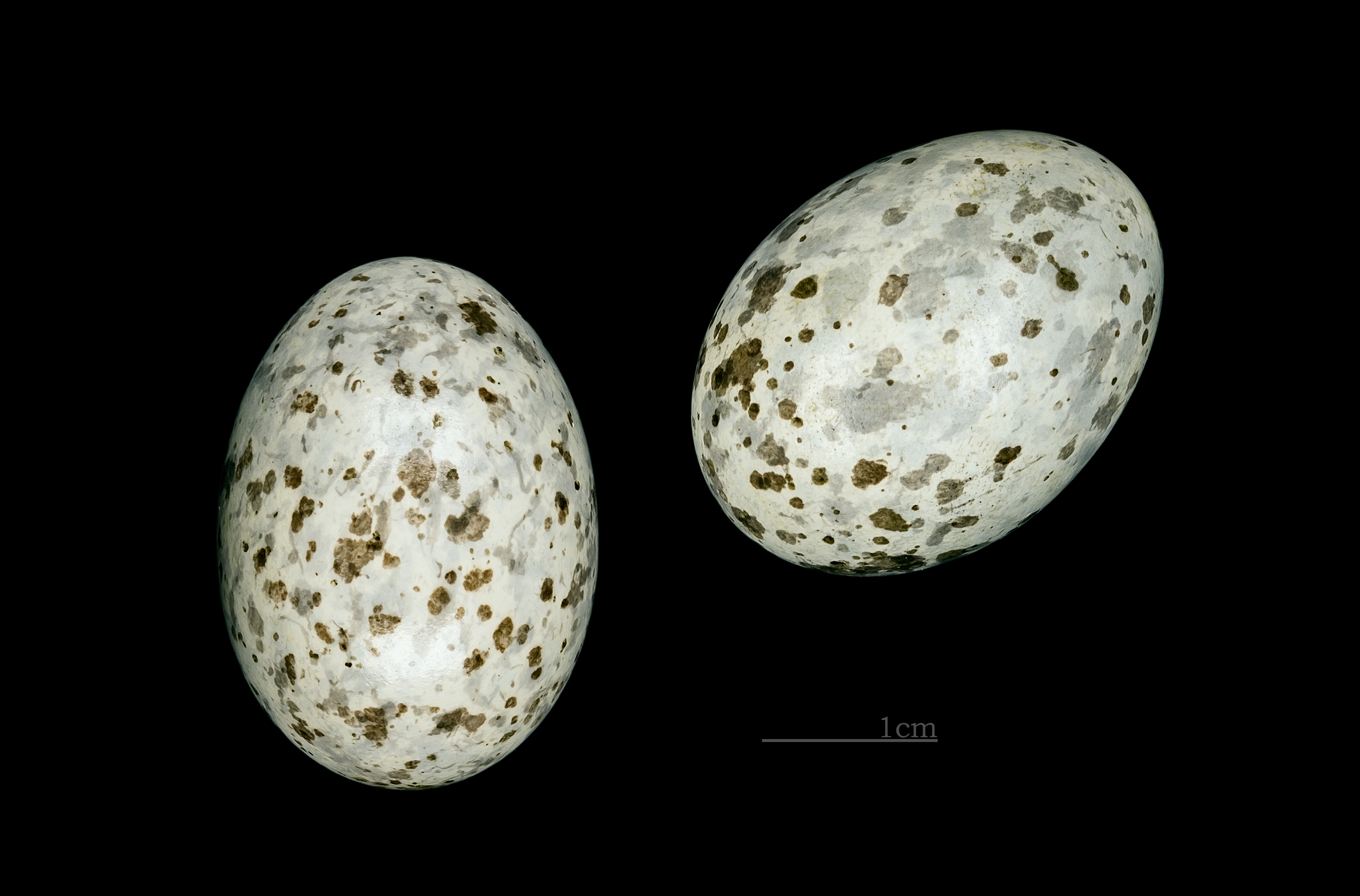
Eggs of Caprimulgus ruficollis MHNT

It is a late migrant, seldom appearing in the breeding area before the end of April or beginning of May. No nest is made; the two elongated and elliptical eggs are placed upon the bare ground; the brooding bird, sitting closely, is their best protection.

== Status and distribution ==
=== Vagrancy ===
The species has occurred as a vagrant twice in northern Europe, in Northumberland, Britain in October 1856, and in Denmark in 1991. The Northumberland bird was shot at Killingworth on 5 October by a gamekeeper, and the specimen purchased by John Hancock. In 2006, Keith Vinicombe and Dominic Mitchell cast doubt on the British record, believing that the lack of detail around the circumstances of finding indicated that a mistake or fraud could not be ruled out. The British Ornithologists' Union Records Committee subsequently re-examined the record and came to the conclusion that it should continue to be regarded as acceptable. The British record is a first-autumn bird of the Iberian race ruficollis, and the Danish record also appears to be of this form; earlier suggestions that the British bird was of the North African race desertorum were erroneous – the specimen's paleness being due to fading whilst on public display at the Hancock Museum. There are also several nineteenth-century European records from outside the species' normal breeding range: from southeast France, Malta, the Canary Islands, Croatia, Israel and Sicily.
