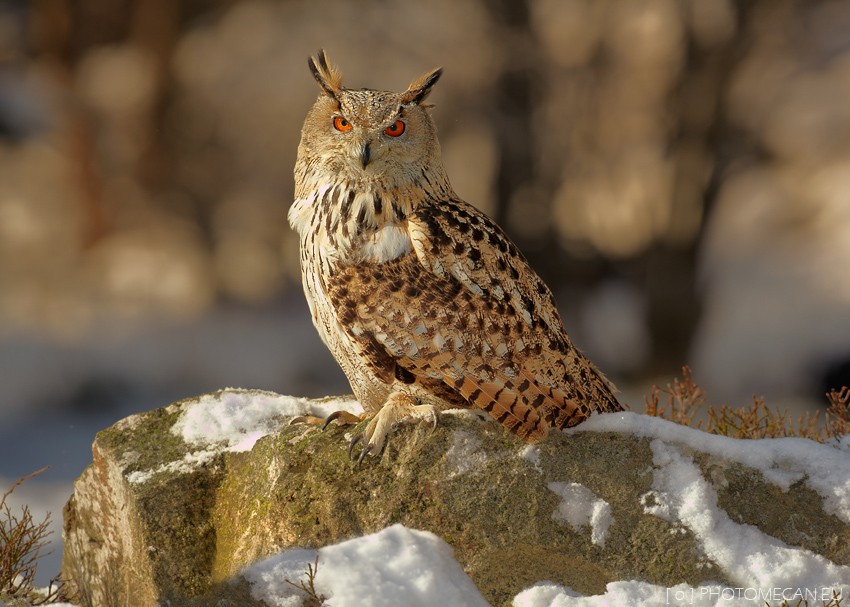
- A Eurasian eagle-owl in Herálec, Czechia

Conservation status
- Least Concern (IUCN 3.1)
- CITES Appendix II

Scientific classification
- Kingdom: Animalia
- Phylum: Chordata
- Class: Aves
- Order: Strigiformes
- Family: Strigidae
- Genus: Bubo
- Species: B. bubo

Binomial name
- Bubo bubo (Linnaeus, 1758)

Subspecies
- See text.
- Range of Eurasian eagle-owl Resident

Synonyms
- Bubo ignavus Forster, 1817; Bubo maximus; Strix bubo Linnaeus, 1758

Audio
- Territorial call of male, recorded near Marianka, Slovakia

= Eurasian eagle-owl =

Species of owl

The Eurasian eagle-owl (Bubo bubo) is a species of eagle-owl, a type of bird that resides much over Eurasia. It is often just called the eagle-owl in Europe and Asia.

It is one of the largest species of owl. Females can grow to a total length of 75 cm (30 in), with a wingspan of 188 centimetres (6 feet 2 inches). Males are slightly smaller. This bird has distinctive ear tufts, with upper parts that are mottled with darker blackish colouring and tawny. The wings and tail are barred. The underparts are a variably hued buff, streaked with darker colouring. The facial disc is not very defined. The orange eyes are distinctive. At least 12 subspecies of the Eurasian eagle-owl are described.

Eurasian eagle-owls are found in many habitats; mostly mountainous and rocky areas, often near varied woodland edge and near shrubby areas with openings or wetlands. They also inhabit coniferous forests, steppes, and remote areas. Occasionally, they are found in farmland and in park-like settings in European and Asian cities and, very rarely, in busier urban areas.

The eagle-owl is mostly a nocturnal predator. Predominantly, they hunt small mammals, such as rodents and rabbits, but also birds and larger mammals. Secondary prey include reptiles, amphibians, fish, large insects, and invertebrates.

The species typically breeds on cliff ledges, in gullies, among rocks, and in other concealed locations. The nest is a scrape containing a clutch of 2–4 eggs typically, which are laid at intervals and hatch at different times. The female incubates the eggs and broods the young. The male brings food for her and for the nestlings. Continuing parental care for the young is provided by both adults for about five months.

In addition to being one of the largest living species of owl, the Eurasian eagle-owl is also one of the most widely distributed. With a total range in Europe and Asia of about 51.4 million km^{2} (19.8 million sq mi) and a total population estimated to be between 100,000 and 500,000 individuals, the IUCN lists the bird's conservation status as being of least concern, although the trend is listed as decreasing. The vast majority of eagle-owls live in Continental Europe, Scandinavia, Russia (which is almost certainly where the peak numbers and diversity of race occurs), and Central Asia. Additional minor populations exist in Anatolia, the northern Middle East, the montane upper part of South Asia, China, Korea and in Japan; in addition, an estimated 12 to 40 pairs are thought to reside in the United Kingdom as of 2016 (where they are arguably non-native), a number which may be on the rise, and have successfully bred in the UK since at least 1996. Tame eagle-owls have occasionally been used in pest control because of their size to deter large birds such as gulls from nesting.

== Description ==
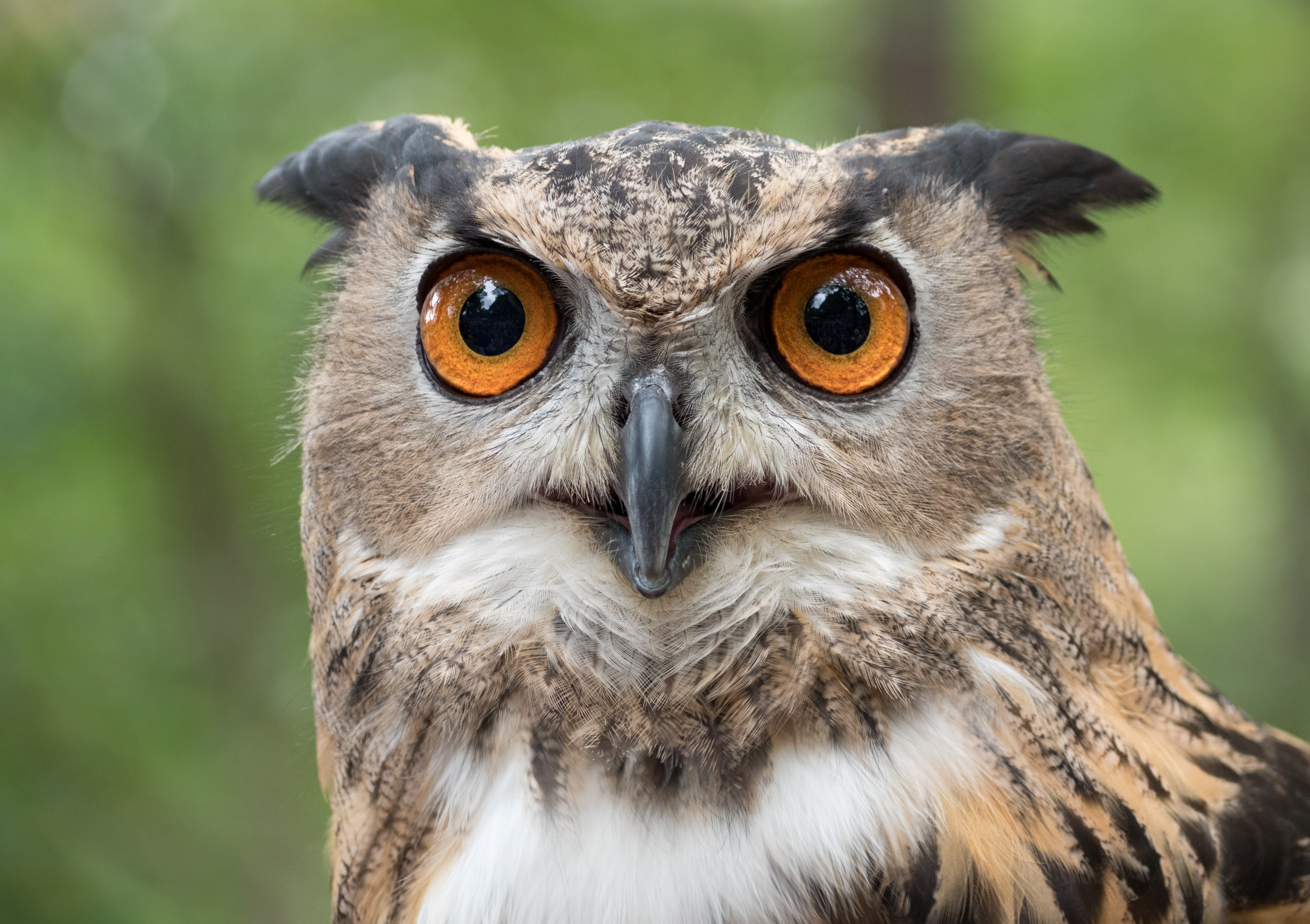
Note the orange eyes and vertical stripes on the chest

The Eurasian eagle-owl is among the larger birds of prey, smaller than the golden eagle (Aquila chrysaetos), but larger than the snowy owl (Bubo scandiacus), despite some overlap in size with both of those species. It is sometimes referred to as the world's largest owl, although Blakiston's fish owl (K. blakistoni) is slightly heavier on average and the much lighter weight great grey owl (Strix nebulosa) is slightly longer on average. Heimo Mikkola reported the largest specimens of eagle-owl as having the same upper body mass, 4.6 kg (10 lb), as the largest Blakiston's fish owl and attained a length around 3 cm (1.2 in) longer. In terms of average weight and wing size, the Blakiston's is the slightly larger species seemingly, even averaging a bit larger in these aspects than the biggest eagle-owl races from Russia. Also, although 9 cm (3.5 in) shorter than the largest of the latter species, the Eurasian eagle-owl can weigh well more than twice as much as the largest great grey owl. The Eurasian eagle-owl typically has a wingspan of 131–188 cm (4 ft 4 in – 6 ft 2 in), with the largest specimens possibly attaining 2 m (6 ft 7 in). The total length of the species can vary from 56 to 75 cm (22 to 30 in). Females can weigh from 1.75 to 4.6 kg (3.9 to 10.1 lb), and males can weigh from 1.2 to 3.2 kg (2.6 to 7.1 lb). In comparison, the barn owl (Tyto alba), the world's most widely distributed owl species, weighs about 0.5 kg (1.1 lb) and the great horned owl (B. virginianus), which fills the eagle-owl's ecological niche in North America, weighs around 1.4 kg (3.1 lb).

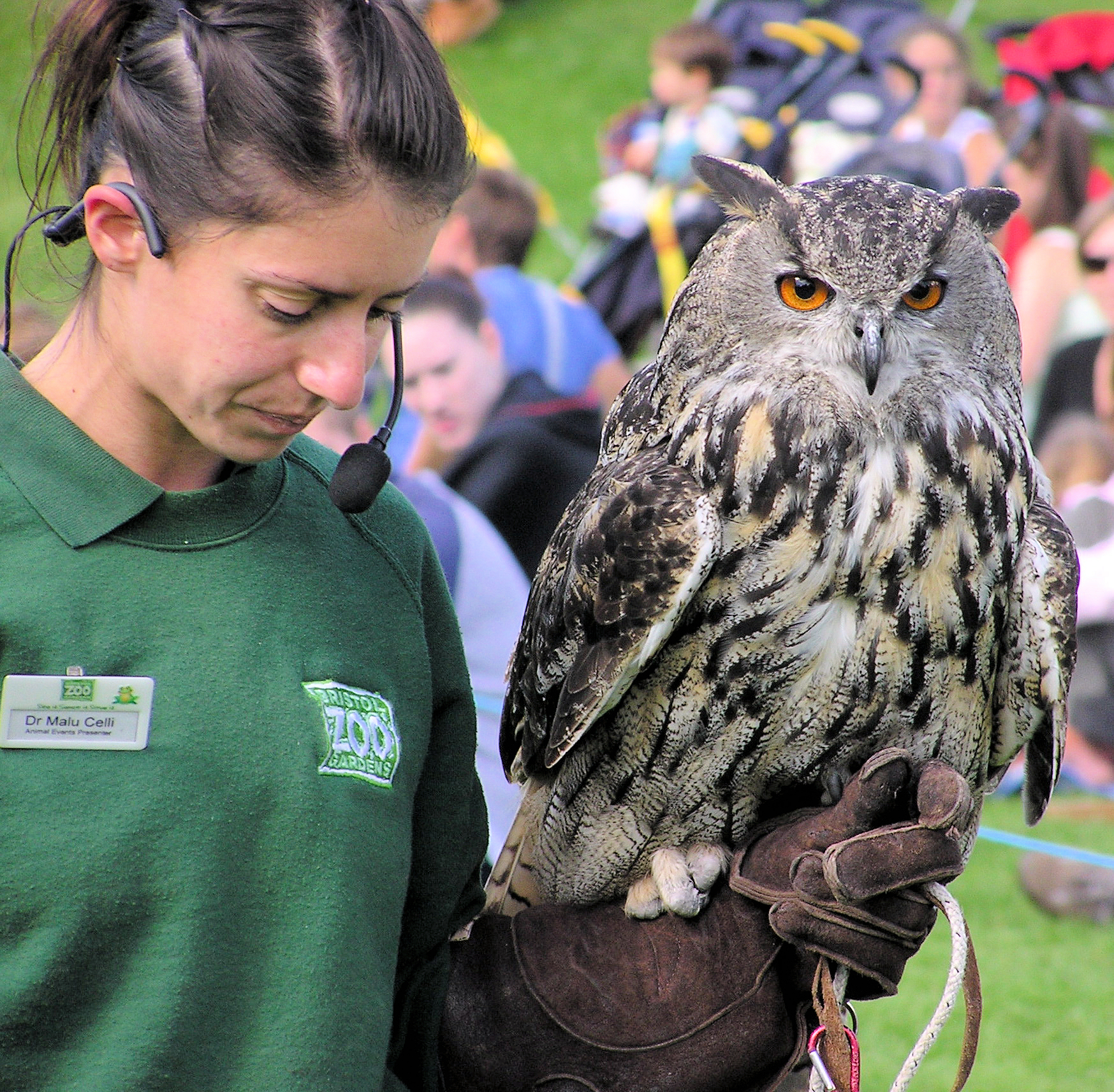
Eurasian eagle-owl in captivity

Besides the female being larger, little external sexual dimorphism is seen in the Eurasian eagle-owl, although the ear tufts of males reportedly tend to be more upright than those of females. When an eagle-owl is seen on its own in the field, distinguishing the individual's sex is generally not possible. Sex determination by size is possible by in-hand measurements. In some populations, the female typically may be slightly darker than the male. The plumage coloration across at least 13 accepted subspecies can be highly variable. The upper parts may be brown-black to tawny-buff to pale creamy gray, typically showing dense freckling on the forehead and crown, stripes on the nape, sides, and back of the neck, and dark splotches on the pale ground colour of the back, mantle, and scapulars. A narrow buff band, freckled with brown or buff, often runs up from the base of the bill, above the inner part of the eye, and along the inner edge of the black-brown ear tufts. The rump and upper tail-coverts are delicately patterned with dark vermiculations and fine, wavy barring, the extent of which varies with subspecies. The underwing coverts and undertail coverts are similar, but tend to be more strongly barred in brownish-black.

The primaries and secondaries are brown with broad, dark brown bars and dark brown tips, and grey or buff irregular lines. A complete moult takes place each year between July and December. The facial disc is tawny-buff, speckled with black-brown, so densely on the outer edge of the disc as to form a "frame" around the face. The chin and throat are white with a brownish central streak. The feathers of the upper breast generally have brownish-black centres and reddish-brown edges except for the central ones, which have white edges. The chin and throat may appear white continuing down the center of the upper breast. The lower breast and belly feathers are creamy-brown to tawny buff to off-white with a variable amount of fine dark wavy barring, on a tawny-buff ground colour. The legs and feet (which are feathered almost to the talons) are likewise marked on a buff ground colour but more faintly. The tail is tawny-buff, mottled dark grey-brown with about six black-brown bars. The bill and feet are black. The iris is most often orange but is fairly variable. In some European birds, the iris is a bright reddish, blood-orange colour but then in subspecies found in arid, desert-like habitats, the iris can range into an orange-yellow colour (most closely related species generally have yellowish irises, excluding the Indian eagle-owl).

=== Standard measurements and physiology ===
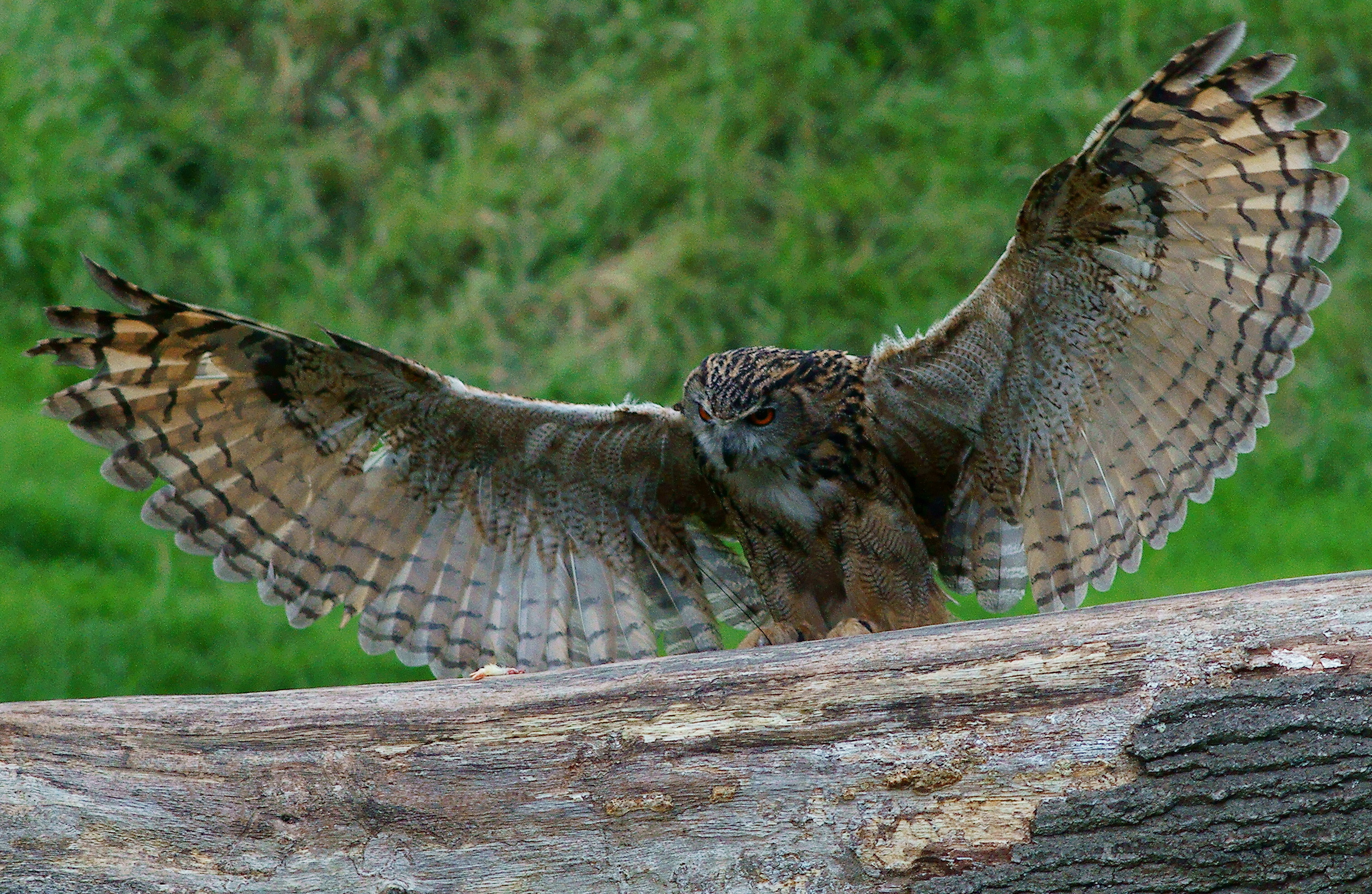
The wings have a wide spread

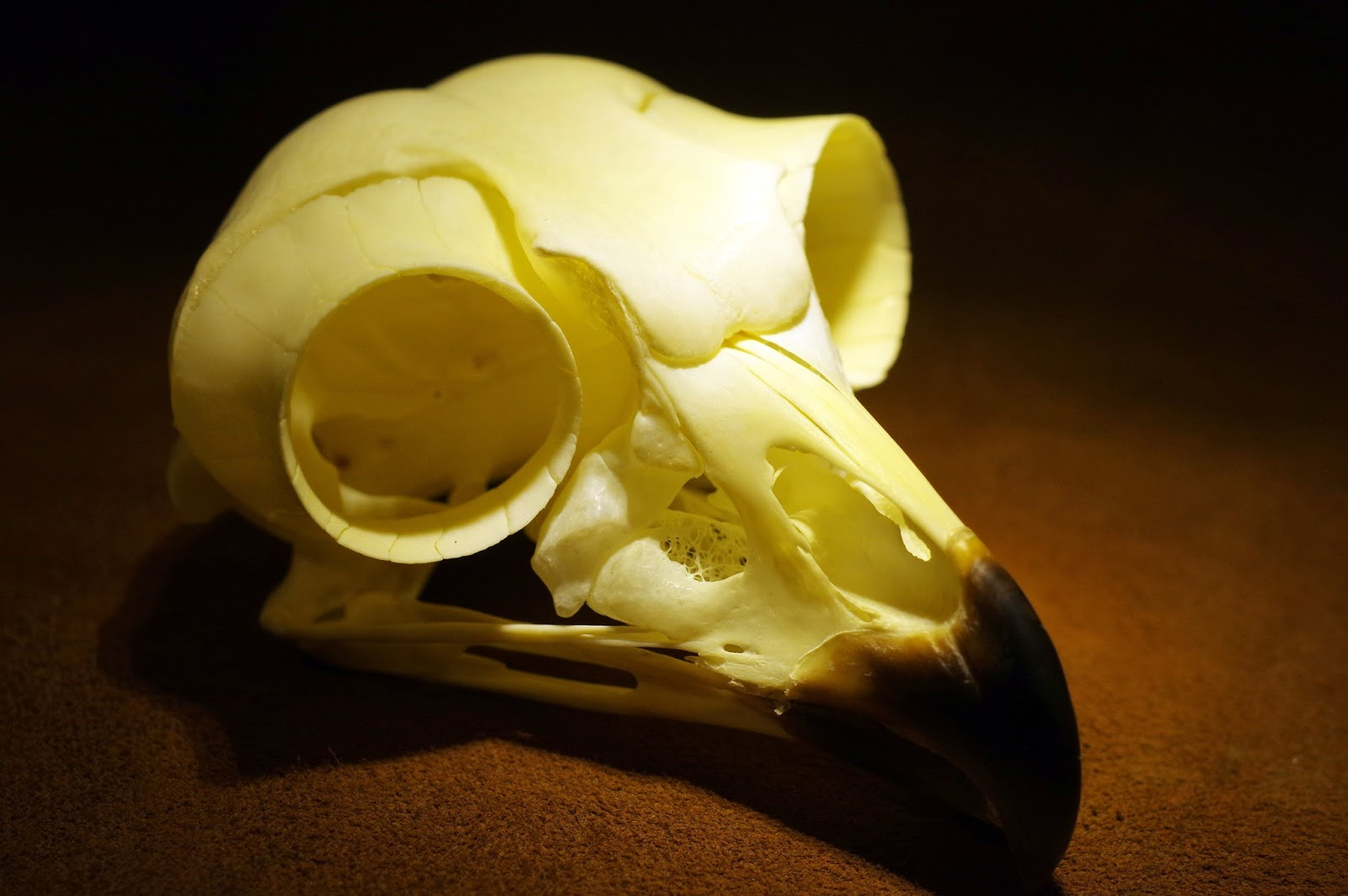
Bubo bubo skull

Among standard measurements for the Eurasian eagle-owl, the wing chord measures 378 to 518 mm (14.9 to 20.4 in), the tail measures 229–310 mm (9.0–12.2 in) long, the tarsus measures 64.5–112 mm (2.54–4.41 in), and the total length of the bill is 38.9–59 mm (1.53–2.32 in). The wings are reportedly the smallest in proportion to the body weight of any European owl, when measured by the weight per area of wing size, was found to be 0.72 g/cm^{2}. Thus, they have quite high wing loading. The great horned owl has even smaller wings (0.8 g/cm^{2}) relative to its body size. The golden eagle has slightly lower wing loading proportionately (0.65 g/cm^{2}), so the aerial abilities of the two species (beyond the eagle's spectacular ability to stoop) may not be as disparate as expected. Some other owls, such as barn owls, short-eared owls (Asio flammeus), and even the related snowy owls have lower wing loading relative to their size, so are presumably able to fly faster, with more agility, and for more extended periods than the Eurasian eagle-owl. In the relatively small race B. b. hispanus, the middle claw, the largest talon, (as opposed to rear hallux-claw, which is the largest in accipitrids) was found to measure from 21.6 to 40.1 mm (0.85 to 1.58 in) in length. A 3.82 kg (8.4 lb) female examined in Britain (origins unspecified) had a middle claw measuring 57.9 mm (2.28 in), on par in length with a large female golden eagle hallux-claw. Generally, owls do not have talons as proportionately large as those of accipitrids, but have stronger, more robust feet relative to their size. Accipitrids use their talons to inflict organ damage and blood loss, whereas typical owls use their feet to constrict their prey to death, the talons serving only to hold the prey in place or provide incidental damage. The talons of the Eurasian eagle-owl are very large and not often exceeded in size by diurnal raptors. Unlike the great horned owls, the overall foot size and strength of the Eurasian eagle-owl is not known to have been tested, but the considerably smaller horned owl has one of the strongest grips ever measured in a bird.

The feathers of the ear tufts in Spanish birds (when not damaged) were found to measure from 63.3 to 86.6 mm (2.49 to 3.41 in). The ear openings (covered in feathers as in all birds) are relatively uncomplicated for an owl, but are also large, being larger on the right than on the left as in most owls, and proportionately larger than those of the great horned owl. In the female, the ear opening averages 31.7 mm (1.25 in) on the right and 27.4 mm (1.08 in) on the left, and in males, averages 26.8 mm (1.06 in) on the right and 24.4 mm (0.96 in) on the left. The depth of the facial disc and the size and complexity of the ear opening are directly correlated to the importance of sound in an owl's hunting behaviour. Examples of owls with more complicated ear structures and deeper facial disc are barn owls, long-eared owls (Asio otus), and boreal owls (Aegolius funereus). Given the uncomplicated structure of their ear openings and relatively shallow, undefined facial discs, hunting by ear is secondary to hunting by sight in eagle-owls; this seems to be true for Bubo in general. More sound-based hunters such as the aforementioned species likely focus their hunting activity in more complete darkness. Also, owls with white throat patches such as the Eurasian eagle-owl are more likely to be active in low-light conditions in the hours before and after sunrise and sunset rather than the darkest times in the middle of the night. The boreal and barn owls, to extend these examples, lack obvious visual cues such as white throat patches (puffed up in displaying eagle-owls), again indicative of primary activity being in darker periods.

=== Distinguishing from other species ===
The great size, bulky, barrel-shaped build, erect ear tufts, and orange eyes render this as a distinctive species. Other than general morphology, the above features differ markedly from those of two of the next largest subarctic owl species in Europe and western Asia, which are the great grey owl and the greyish to chocolate-brown Ural owl (Strix uralensis), both of which have no ear tufts and have a distinctly rounded head, rather than the blocky shape of the eagle-owl's head. The snowy owl is obviously distinctive from most eagle-owls, but during winter the palest Eurasian eagle-owl race (B. b. sibiricus) can appear off-white. Nevertheless, the latter is still distinctively an ear-tufted Eurasian eagle-owl and lacks the pure white background colour and variable blackish spotting of the slightly smaller species (which has relatively tiny, vestigial ear tufts that have only been observed to have flared on rare occasions).

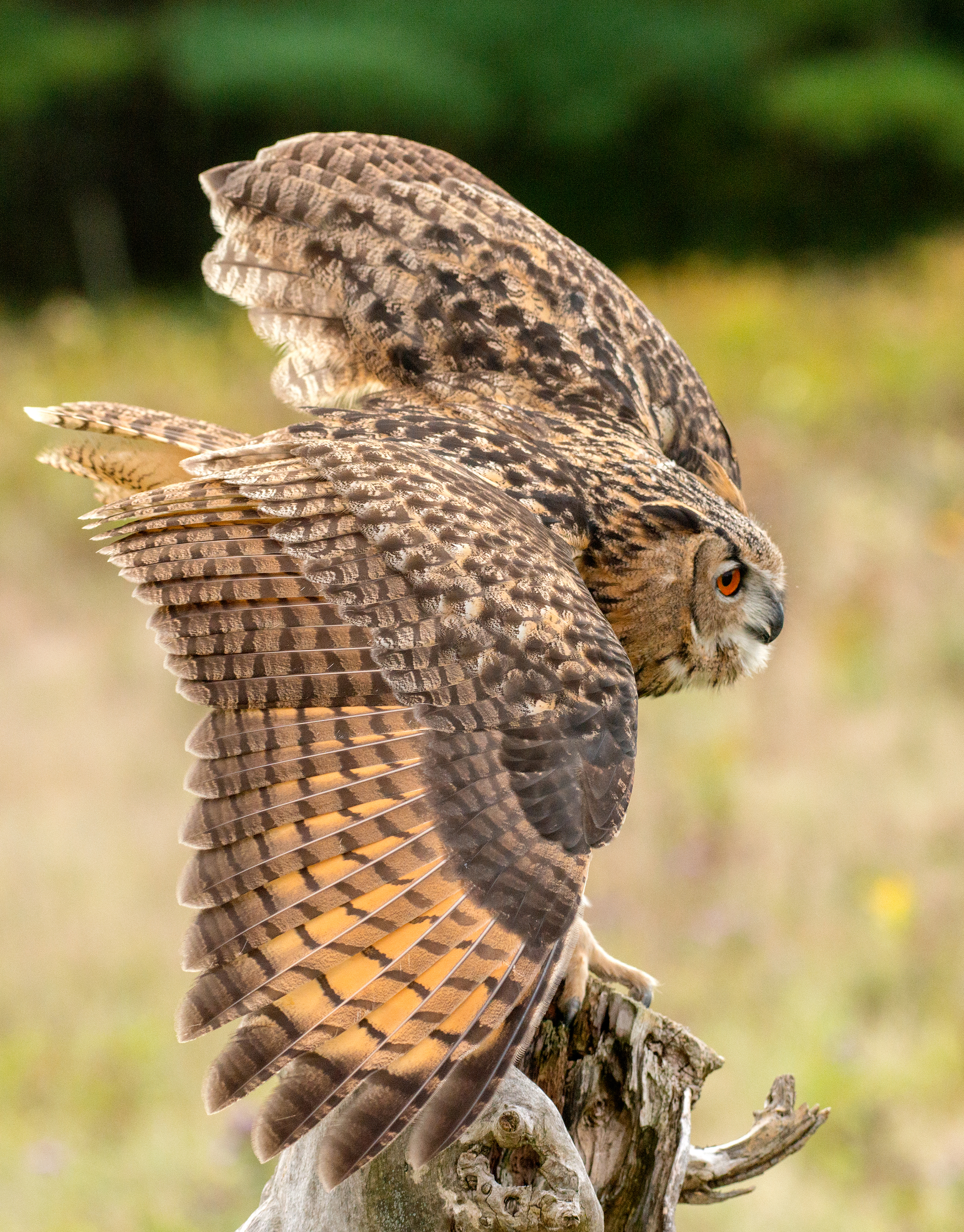
Unique camouflage pattern

The long-eared owl has a somewhat similar plumage to the eagle-owl, but is considerably smaller (an average female eagle-owl may be twice as long and 10 times heavier than an average long-eared owl). Long-eared owls in Eurasia have vertical striping like that of the Eurasian eagle-owl, while long-eared owls in North America show a more horizontal striping like that of great horned owls. Whether these are examples of mimicry either way is unclear but it is known that both Bubo owls are serious predators of long-eared owls. The same discrepancy in underside streaking has also been noted in the Eurasian and American representations of the grey owl. A few other related species overlap minimally in range in Asia, mainly in East Asia and the southern reaches of the Eurasian eagle-owl's range. Three fish owls appear to overlap in range, the brown (Ketupa zeylonensis) in at least northern Pakistan, probably Kashmir, and discontinuously in southern Turkey, the tawny (K. flavipes) through much of eastern China, and Blakiston's fish owl in the Russian Far East, northeastern China, and Hokkaido. Fish owls are distinctively different looking, possessing more scraggy ear tufts that hang to the side rather than sit erect on top of the head, and generally have more uniform, brownish plumages without the contrasting darker streaking of an eagle-owl. The brown fish owl has no feathering on the tarsus or feet, and the tawny has feathering only on the upper portion of the tarsi, but the Blakiston's is nearly as extensively feathered on the tarsi and feet as the eagle-owl. Tawny and brown fish owls are both slightly smaller than co-occurring Eurasian eagle-owls, and Blakiston's fish owls are similar or slightly larger than co-occurring large northern eagle-owls. Fish owls, being tied to the edges of fresh water, where they hunt mainly fish and crabs, also have slightly differing, and more narrow, habitat preferences.

In the lower Himalayas of northern Pakistan and Jammu and Kashmir, along with the brown fish owl, the Eurasian eagle-owl at the limit of its distribution may co-exist with at least two to three other eagle-owls. One of these, the dusky eagle-owl (K. coromandus) is smaller, with more uniform tan-brownish plumage, untidy uniform light streaking rather than the Eurasian's dark streaking below and an even less well-defined facial disc. The dusky is usually found in slightly more enclosed woodland areas than Eurasian eagle-owls. Another is possibly the spot-bellied eagle-owl (K. nipalensis), which is strikingly different looking, with stark brown plumage, rather than the warm hues typical of the Eurasian, bold spotting on a whitish background on the belly, and somewhat askew ear tufts that are bold white with light brown crossbars on the front. Both species may occur in some parts of the Himalayan foothills, but they are not currently verified to occur in the same area, in part because of the spot-bellied's preference for dense, primary forest. Most similar, with basically the same habitat preferences and the only one verified to co-occur with the Eurasian eagle-owls of the race B. b. turcomanus in Kashmir is the Indian eagle-owl (B. bengalensis). The Indian species is smaller, with a bolder, blackish facial disc border, more rounded and relatively smaller wings, and partially unfeathered toes. Far to the west, the pharaoh eagle-owl (B. ascalaphus) also seemingly overlaps in range with the Eurasian, at least in Jordan. Although also relatively similar to the Eurasian eagle-owl, the pharaoh eagle-owl is distinguished by its smaller size, paler, more washed-out plumage, and the diminished size of its ear tufts.

=== Moulting ===
The Eurasian eagle-owls' feathers are lightweight and robust, but nevertheless need to be replaced periodically as they become worn. In the Eurasian eagle-owl, this happens in stages, and the first moult starts the year after hatching with some body feathers and wing coverts being replaced. The next year, the three central secondaries on each wing and three middle tail feathers are shed and regrow, and the following year, two or three primaries and their coverts are lost. In the final year of this postjuvenile moult, the remaining primaries are moulted and all the juvenile feathers will have been replaced. Another moult takes place during years 6–12 of the bird's life. This happens between June and October after the conclusion of the breeding season, and again it is a staged process with six to nine main flight feathers being replaced each year. Such a moulting pattern lasting several years is repeated throughout the bird's life.

== Taxonomy ==
The Eurasian eagle-owl was formally described by the Swedish naturalist Carl Linnaeus in 1758 in the tenth edition of his Systema Naturae under the binomial name Strix bulbo. Although Linnaeus specified the "habitat" as "Europa" the type locality is restricted to Sweden. The Eurasian eagle-owl is now placed in the genus Bubo that was introduced by André Duméril in 1805.

The genus Bubo with about 10 extant species includes many of the larger owl species in the world today. Based on an extensive fossil record and a central distribution of extant species on that continent, Bubo appears to have evolved into existence in Africa, although early radiations seem to branch from southern Asia, as well. Formerly Bubo was more diverse but recent genetic testing revealed that 8 former members of the genera properly fall into a separate but related genera Ketupa with the fish owls. Addirionally, while some authors have considered fishing owls as possibly inclusive with Bubo, they are also distinct and belong in the genus Scotopelia. Two genera belonging to the scops owls complex, the giant scops owls (Otus gurneyi) found in Asia and the Ptilopsis or the white-faced scops owl found in Africa, although firmly ensconced in the scops owl group, appear to share some characteristics with the eagle-owls. The Strix genus is also related to Bubo, and is considered a "sister complex", with Pulsatrix possibly being intermediate between the two. The Eurasian eagle-owl appears to represent an expansion of the genus Bubo into the Eurasian continent. A few of the other species of Bubo seem to have been derived from the Eurasian eagle-owl, making it a "paraspecies", or they at least share a relatively recent common ancestor.

The Pharaoh eagle-owl, distributed in the Arabian Peninsula and sections of the Sahara Desert through North Africa where rocky outcrops are found, was until recently considered a subspecies of the Eurasian eagle-owl. The Pharaoh eagle-owl apparently differs about 3.8% in mitochondrial DNA from the Eurasian eagle-owl, well past the minimum genetic difference to differentiate species of 1.5%. Smaller and paler than Eurasian eagle-owls, the Pharaoh eagle-owl can also be considered a distinct species largely due to its higher-pitched and more descending call, and the observation that Eurasian eagle-owls formerly found in Morocco (B. b. hispanus) apparently did not breed with the co-existing Pharaoh eagle-owls. On the contrary, the race still found together with the Pharaoh eagle-owl in the wild (B. b. interpositus) in the central Middle East has been found to interbreed in the wild with the Pharaoh eagle-owl, although genetical materials have indicated B. b. interpositus may itself be a distinct species from the Eurasian eagle-owl, as it differs from the nominate subspecies of the Eurasian eagle-owl by 2.8% in mitochondrial DNA. For three Asian Eurasian eagle-owl subspecies (B. b. ussuriensis, B. b. kiautschensis and B. b. hemachlana, respectively), it was found that they met the criterion for subspecies well, with a high haplotype diversity and in spite of a relatively recent common ancestor and low genetic diversity. The Indian eagle-owl (B. bengalensis) was also considered a subspecies of the Eurasian eagle-owl until recently, but its smaller size, distinct voice (more clipped and high-pitched than the Eurasian), and the fact that it is largely allopatric in distribution (filling out the Indian subcontinent) with other Eurasian eagle-owl races has led to it being considered a distinct species. The mitochondrial DNA of the Indian species also appears considerably distinct from the Eurasian species. The Cape eagle-owl (B. capensis) appears to represent a return of this genetic line back into the African continent, where it leads a lifestyle similar to Eurasian eagle-owls, albeit far to the south. Another offshoot of the northern Bubo group is the snowy owl. It appears to have separated from other Bubo species at least 4 million years ago.

The fourth and most famous derivation of the evolutionary line that includes the Eurasian eagle-owl is the great horned owl, which appears to have been the result of primitive eagle-owls spreading into North America. According to some authorities, the great horned owls and Eurasian eagle-owls are barely distinct as species, with a similar level of divergence in their plumages as the Eurasian and North American representations of the great grey owl or the long-eared owl. More outward physical differences exist between the great horned owl and the Eurasian eagle-owl than in those two examples, including a great size difference favoring the Eurasian species, the great horned owl's horizontal rather than vertical underside barring, yellow rather than orange eyes, and a much stronger black bracket to the facial disc, not to mention a number of differences in their reproductive behaviour and distinctive voices. Furthermore, genetic research has revealed that the snowy owl is more closely related to the great horned owl than are Eurasian eagle-owls. The most closely related species beyond the Pharaoh, Indian, and Cape eagle-owls to the Eurasian eagle-owl is the smaller, less powerful and African spotted eagle-owl (B. africanus), which was likely to have divided from the line before they radiated away from Africa. Somehow, genetic materials indicate the spotted eagle-owl appears to share a more recent ancestor with the Indian eagle-owl than with the Eurasian eagle-owl or even the sympatric Cape eagle-owl. Eurasian eagle-owls in captivity have produced apparently healthy hybrids with both the Indian eagle-owl and the great horned owl. The pharaoh, Indian, and Cape eagle-owls and the great horned owl are all broadly similar in size to each other, but all are considerably smaller than the Eurasian eagle-owl, which averages at least 15–30% larger in linear dimensions and 30–50% larger in body mass than these other related species, possibly as the eagle-owls adapted to warmer climates and smaller prey. Fossils from southern France have indicated that during the Middle Pleistocene, Eurasian eagle-owls (this paleosubspecies is given the name B. b. davidi) were larger than they are today, even larger were those found in Azerbaijan and in the Caucasus (either B. b. bignadensis or B. bignadensis), which were deemed to date to the Late Pleistocene. About 12 subspecies are recognized today.

=== Subspecies ===
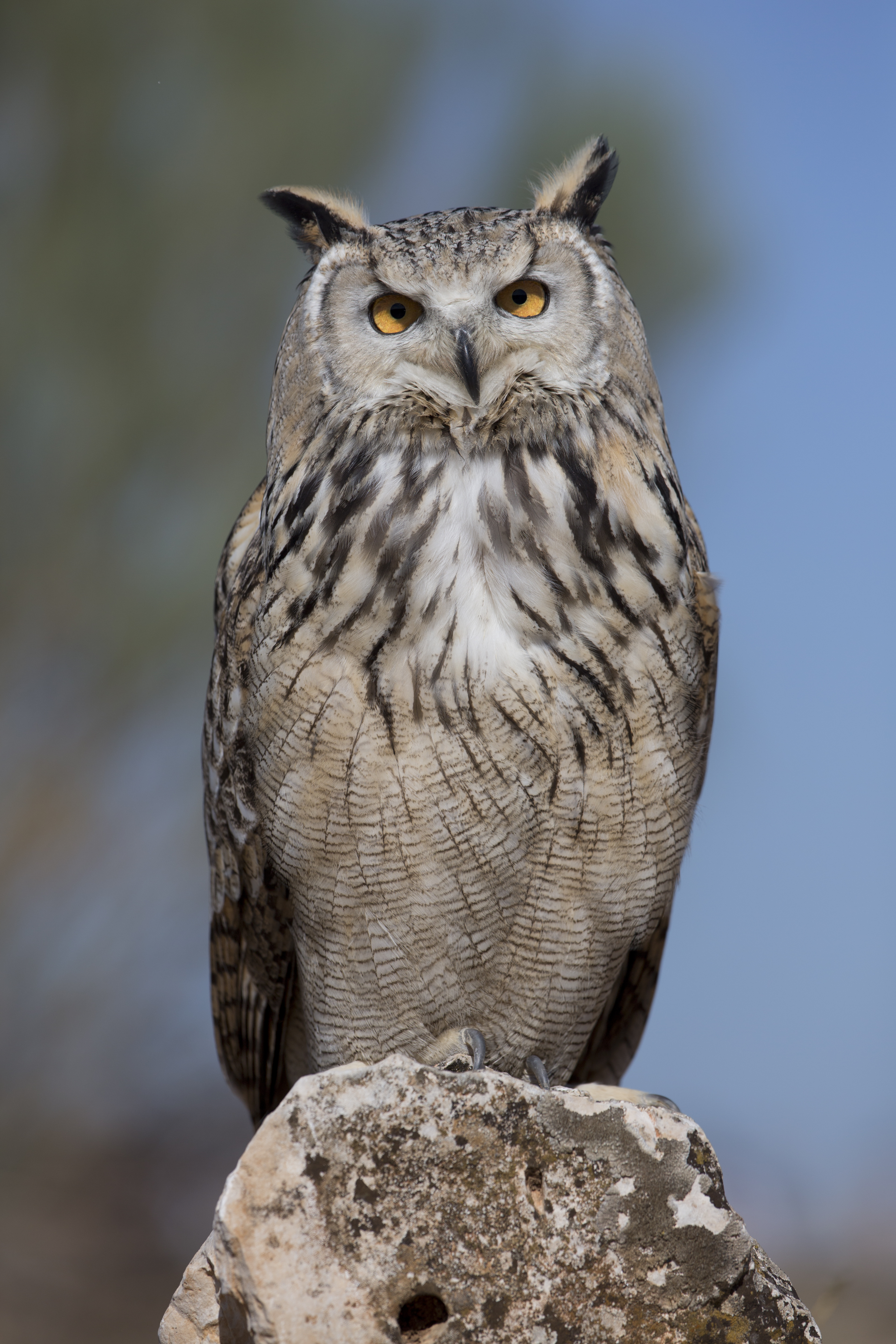
A captive adult eagle-owl, although identified as part of the subspecies B. b. sibiricus, its appearance is more consistent with B. b. ruthenus

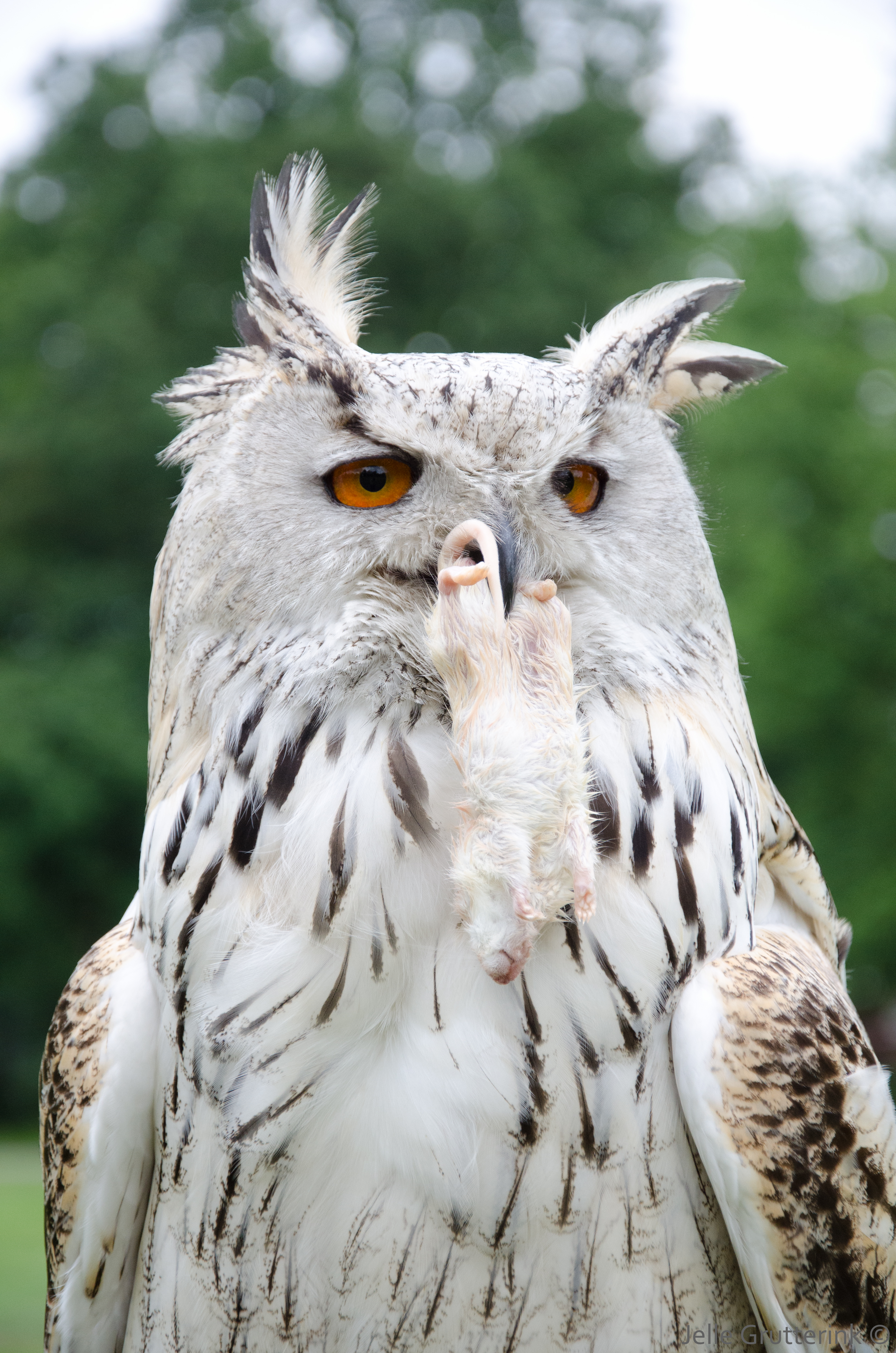
A captive adult eagle-owl with a pale appearance, likely part of B. b. sibiricus

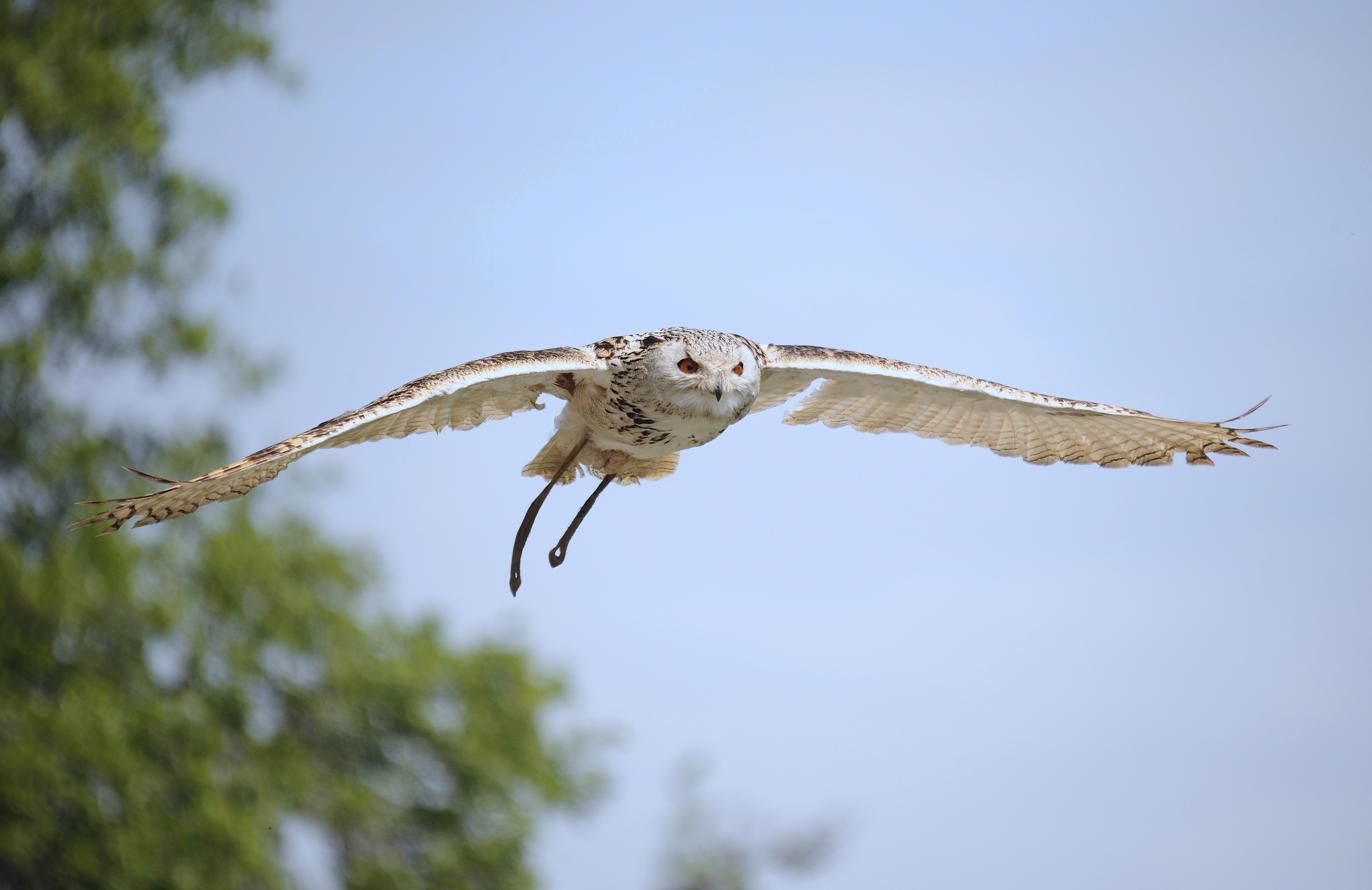
Captive western Siberian eagle-owl (B. b. sibiricus) in flight, Wildpark Poing, Germany

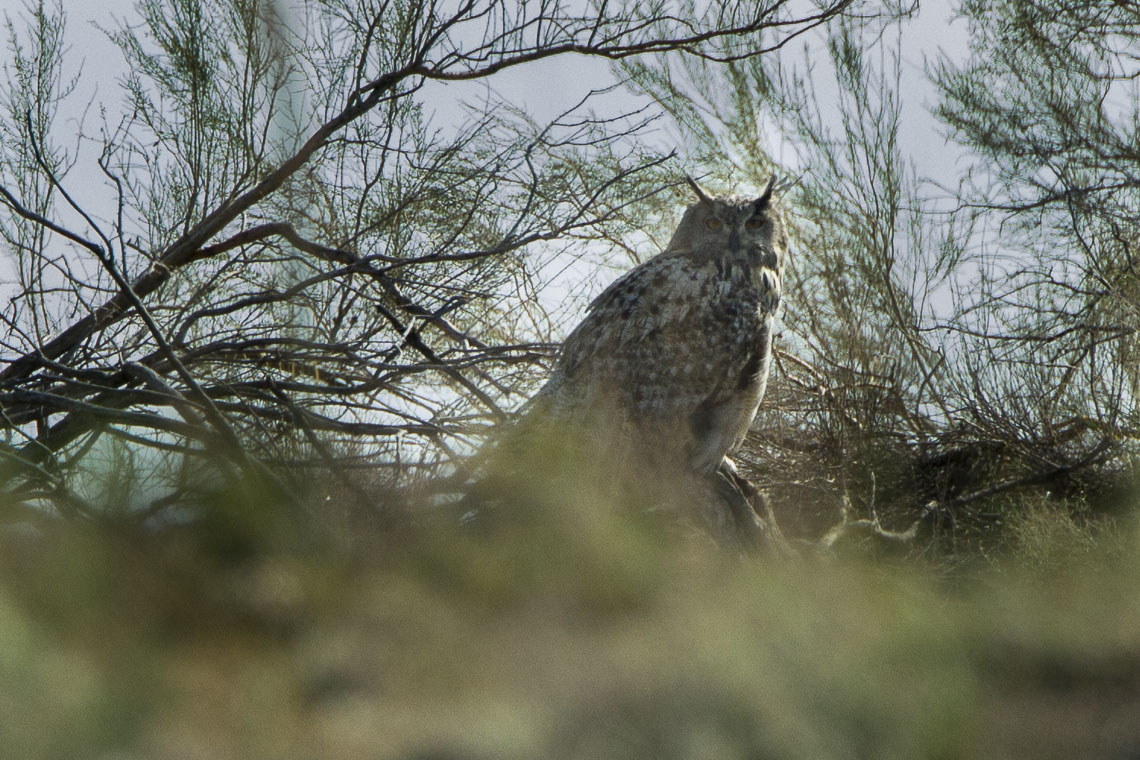
An eagle-owl in the wild in Kazakhstan, B. b. turcomanus

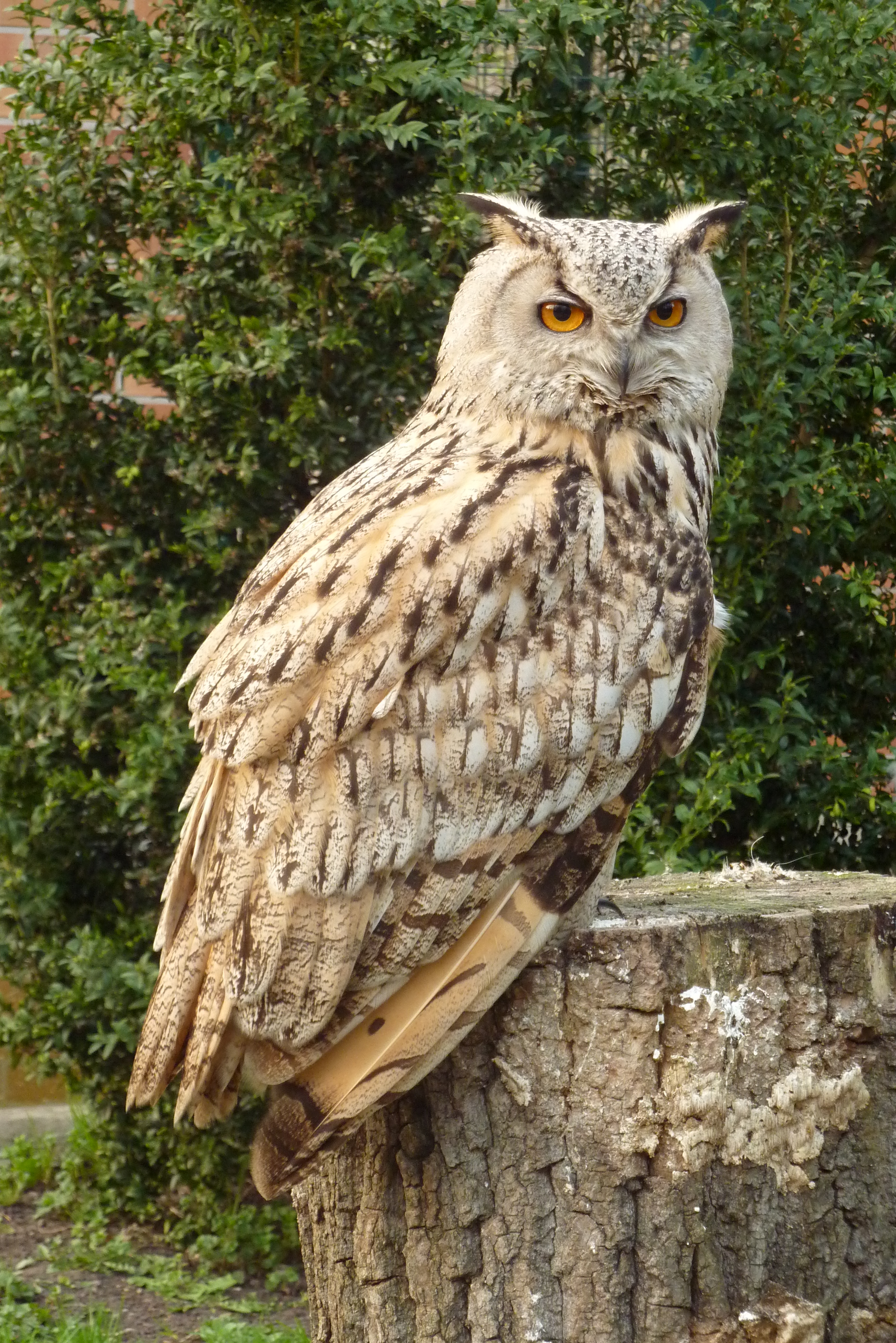
B. b. omissus at Tierpark Berlin, Germany

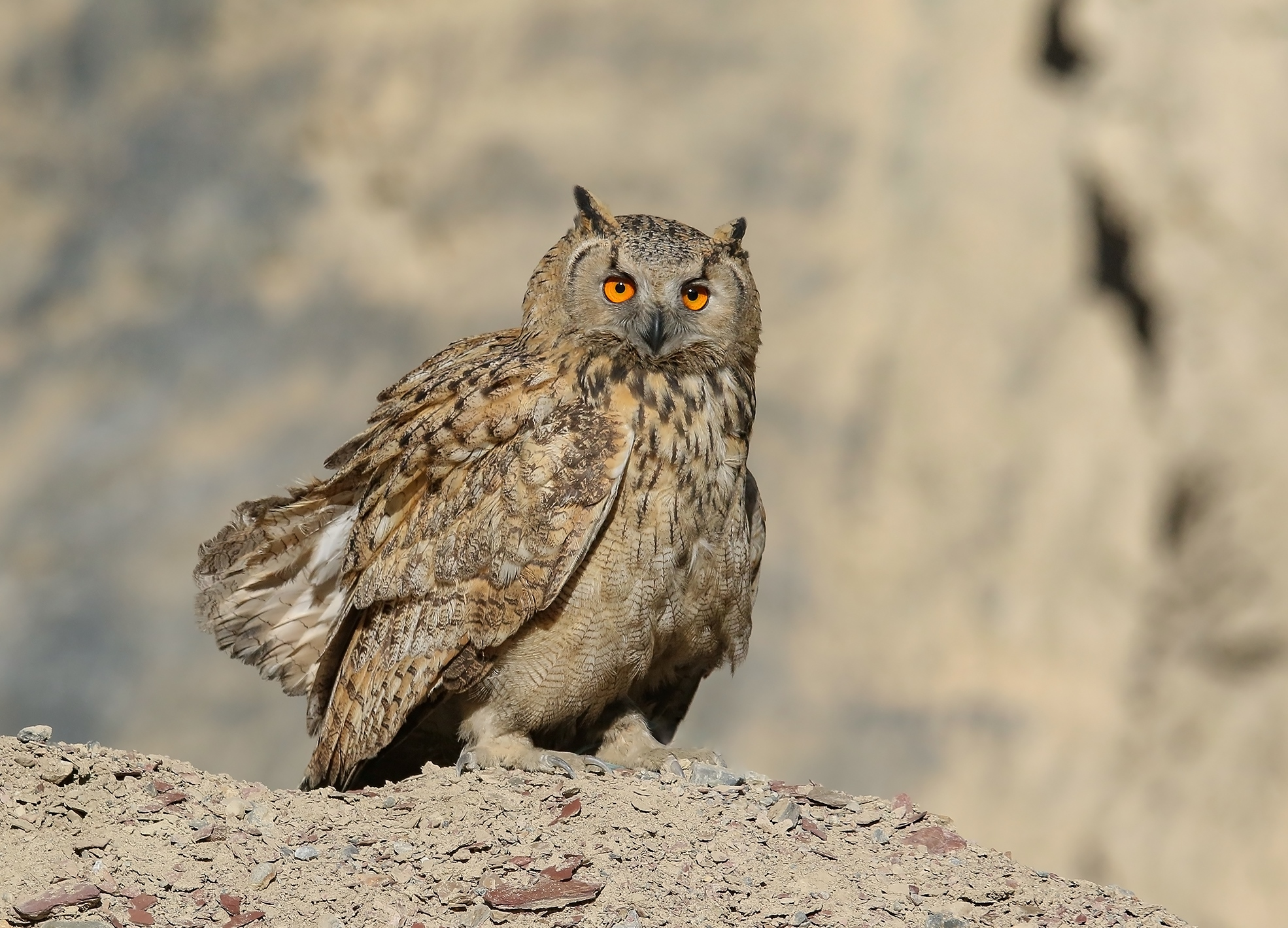
A wild eagle-owl in Pakistan, B. b. hemachalana

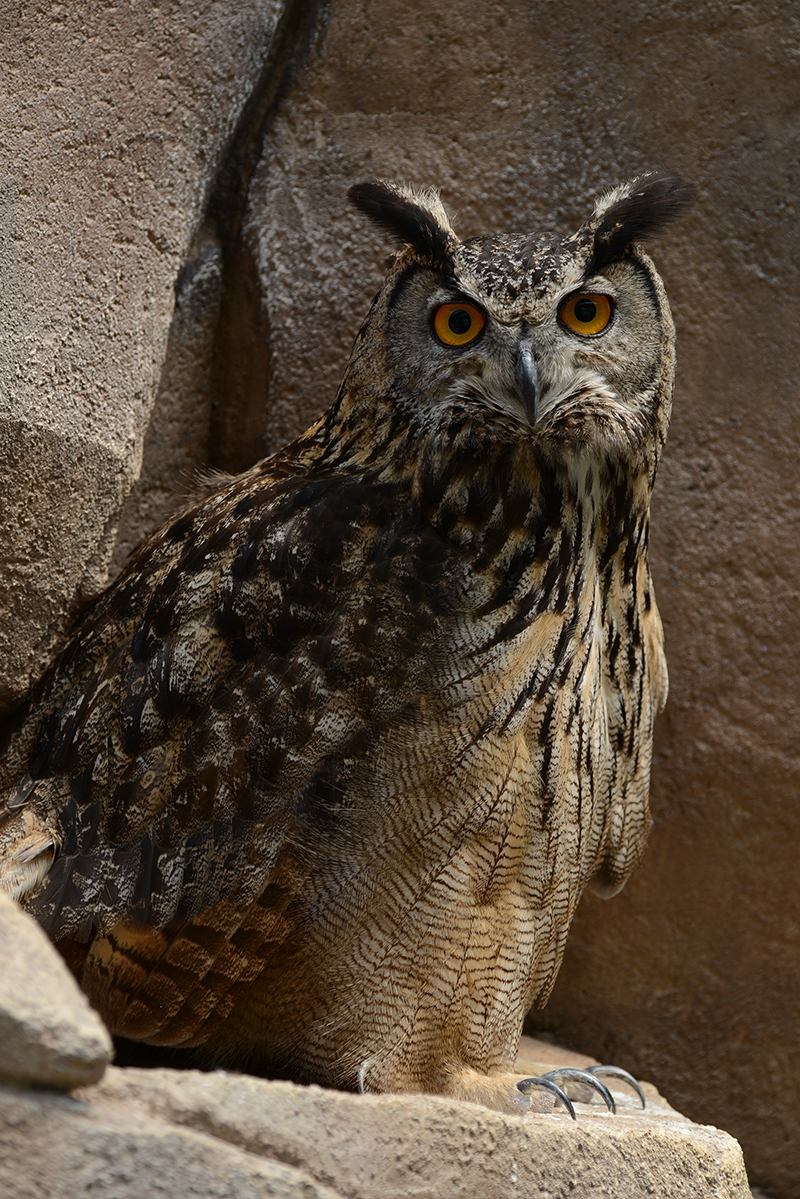
Captive eagle-owl in Korea, possibly part of the race B. b. kiatschensis

- B. b. hispanus (Rothschild and Hartert, 1910) – Also known as the Spanish eagle-owl or the Iberian eagle-owl. This subspecies mainly occurs on the Iberian Peninsula, where it occupies a majority of Spain and scattered spots in Portugal. B. b. hispanus also inhabited, at least historically, wooded areas of the Atlas Mountains in Northern Africa, making it the only subspecies of Eurasian eagle-owl known to breed in Africa, but this population is thought to be extinct. In terms of its life history, this may be the most extensively studied subspecies of eagle-owl. The Spanish eagle-owl is the most similar in plumage to the nominate subspecies amongst other subspecies, but tends to be a somewhat lighter, more greyish colour, with generally lighter streaking and a paler belly. In males, wing chord length can range from 40 to 45 cm (16 to 18 in) and in females from 445 to 485 mm (17.5 to 19.1 in). Wingspans in this subspecies can vary from 131 to 168 cm (4 ft 4 in to 5 ft 6 in), averaging about 154.1 cm (5 ft 1 in). Among standard measurements of B. b. hispanus, the tail is 23 to 31 cm (9.1 to 12.2 in), the total bill length is 38.9 to 54.3 mm (1.53 to 2.14 in) and the tarsus is 64.5 to 81 mm (2.54 to 3.19 in). Adult male B. b. hispanus from Spain weigh 1.22 to 1.9 kg (2.7 to 4.2 lb), averaging 1.63 kg (3.6 lb), while females weigh from 1.75 to 2.49 kg (3.9 to 5.5 lb), averaging 2.11 kg (4.7 lb).
- B. b. bubo (Linnaeus, 1758) – Also known as the European eagle-owl, the nominate subspecies inhabits continental Europe from near the Arctic Circle in Norway, Sweden, Finland, the southern Kola Peninsula, and Arkhangelsk where it ranges north to about latitude 64° 30' N., southward to the Baltic Sea, central Germany, to southeastern Belgium, eastern, central, and southern France to Northern Spain and parts of Italy including Sicily, and through Central and Southeastern Europe to Greece. It intergrades with B. b. ruthenus in northern Russia around the basin of the upper Mezen River and in the eastern vicinity of Gorki Leninskiye, Tambov and Voronezh, and intergrades with B. b. interpositus in northern Ukraine. This is a medium-sized race, measuring in wing chord length 435–480 mm (17.1–18.9 in) in males and 455–500 mm (17.9–19.7 in). In captive owls of this subspecies, the mean wingspan were 157 cm (5 ft 2 in) for males and 167.5 cm (5 ft 6 in) for females. The total bill length is 45 to 56 mm (1.8 to 2.2 in). Adult male European eagle-owls from Norway weigh 1.63 to 2.81 kg (3.6 to 6.2 lb), averaging 2.38 kg (5.2 lb), while females there weigh from 2.28 to 4.2 kg (5.0 to 9.3 lb), averaging 2.95 kg (6.5 lb). Unsurprisingly, adult owls from western Finland were about the same size, averaging 2.65 kg (5.8 lb). Another set of Finnish eagle-owls averaged somewhat larger still, with males averaging 2.64 kg (5.8 lb) and females averaging 3.16 kg (7.0 lb). The subspecies seems to follow Bergmann's rule in regards to body size decreasing closer to the Equator, as specimens from central Europe average 2.14 or 2.3 kg (4.7 or 5.1 lb) in body mass and those from Italy average about 2.01 kg (4.4 lb). The weight range for eagle-owls in Italy is 1.5 to 3 kg (3.3 to 6.6 lb). The nominate subspecies is perhaps the darkest of eagle-owl subspecies. Many nominate birds are heavily overlaid with broad black streaking over the upper-parts, head and chest. While generally a brownish base-colour, many nominate owls can appear rich rufous, especially about the head, upper-back and wing primaries. The lower belly is usually a buff brown, as opposed to whitish or yellowish in several other subspecies. Birds seen from Italy may show a tendency to be smaller than more northern birds and are reportedly duller, possessing paler ground coloration, and more narrow streaks. In Scandinavia, some birds are so darkly plumaged as to give a blackish-brown impression with almost no paler colour showing.
- B. b. ruthenus (Buturlin and Zhitkov, 1906) – May be also known as the eastern eagle-owl. This subspecies replaces the nominate in eastern Russia from about latitude 660 N. in the Timan-Pechora Basin south to the western Ural Mountains and the upper Don and lower Volga Rivers. This is a fairly large subspecies going on wing chord length, which is 430–468 mm (16.9–18.4 in) in males and 470–515 mm (18.5–20.3 in) in females. The subspecies is intermediate in coloration between the nominate subspecies and B. b. sibiricus. B. b. ruthenus may be confused with B. b. interpositus, even by authoritative ornithologists. B. b. interpositus is darker than B. b. ruthenus, distinctly more yellowish, less gray, and its brown pattern is darker, heavier, and more regular. The entire colour pattern of B. b. interpositus is brighter, richer, and more contrasting than that of B. b. ruthenus, but B. b. interpositus, though very well characterized, is an intermediate subspecies.
- B. b. interpositus (Rothschild and Hartert, 1910) – May be also known as Aharoni's eagle-owl or the Byzantine eagle-owl. B. b. interpositus ranges from southern Russia, south of the nominate, with which it intergrades in northern Ukraine, from Bessarabia and the steppes of Ukraine north to Kyiv and Kharkiv then eastward to the Crimea, the Caucasus and Transcaucasia to northwestern and northern Iran (Elburz, region of Tehran, and probably the southern Caspian districts), and through Asia Minor south to Syria and Iraq but not to the Syrian desert where it is replaced by the pharaoh eagle-owl. The latter and B. b. interpositus reportedly hybridize from western Syria south to southern Palestine. B. b. interpositus may be a distinct species from the Eurasian eagle-owl based on genetic studies. This medium-sized subspecies is about the same size as the nominate subspecies B. b. bubo, with male wing chord lengths 425 to 475 mm (16.7 to 18.7 in) and female lengths of 440 to 503 mm (17.3 to 19.8 in). It differs from the nominate subspecies by being paler and more yellow, less ferruginous, and by having a sharper brown pattern; from B. b. turcomanus by being very much darker and less yellow, and also by being much more sharply and heavily patterned with brown. Aharoni's eagle-owl is darker and more rusty than B. b. ruthenus.
- B. b. sibiricus (Gloger, 1833) – Also known as the western Siberian eagle-owl. This subspecies is distributed from the Ural Mountains of western Siberia and Bashkiria to the mid Ob River and the western Altai Mountains, north to limits of the taiga, the most northerly distribution known in the species overall. B. b. sibiricus is a large subspecies, wherein the males measure 435–480 mm (17.1–18.9 in) in wing chord length, while the females are 472–515 mm (18.6–20.3 in). Captive males were found to measure 155 to 170 cm (5 ft 1 in to 5 ft 7 in) in wingspan and weigh 1.62 to 3.2 kg (3.6 to 7.1 lb); whereas the females measure 165 to 190 cm (5 ft 5 in to 6 ft 3 in) in wingspan and weigh 2.28 to 4.5 kg (5.0 to 9.9 lb). Males were cited with a mean body mass of approximately 2.5 kg (5.5 lb). This subspecies is physically the most distinctive of all the Eurasian eagle-owls, and is sometimes considered the most "beautiful and striking". It is the most pale of the eagle-owl subspecies; the general coloration is a buffy off-white overlaid with dark markings. The crown, hindneck and underparts are streaked blackish but somewhat sparingly, with the lower breast and belly indistinctly barred, the primary coverts dark, contrasting with rest of the wing. The head, back and shoulders are only somewhat dark unlike in most other subspecies. In the eastern limits of its range, B. b. sibiricus may intergrade with B. b. yenisseensis.
- B. b. yenisseensis (Buturlin, 1911) – Also known as the eastern Siberian eagle-owl. This subspecies is found in central Siberia from about the Ob eastward to Lake Baikal, north to about latitudes 580 to 590 N on the Yenisei River, south to the Altai, Tarbagatai and the Saur Mountain ranges and in Tannu Tuva and Khangai Mountains in northwestern Mongolia, grading into B. b. sibiricus near Tomsk in the west and into B. b. ussuriensis in the east of northern Mongolia. The zone of intergradations with the latter in Mongolia seems to be quite extensive, with intermediate eagle-owls being especially prevalent around the Tuul River Valley, resulting in owls intermediate in coloration between B. b. yenisseensis and B. b. ussuriensis. B. b. yenisseensis is a large subspecies, with wing chord lengths of 435–470 mm (17.1–18.5 in) in males and 473–518 mm (18.6–20.4 in) in females. B. b. yenisseensis is typically much darker with more yellowish ground colour than B. b. sibiricus. It does have a similar amount of dazzling white on its underwing as does sibiricus. It is buffy-greyish overall with well-expressed dark patterning on the upper-parts and around the head. The underside is overall pale greyish with black streaking.
- B. b. jakutensis (Buturlin, 1908) – May be also known as the Yakutian eagle-owl. This subspecies inhabits northeastern Siberia, from southern Yakutia north to about latitude 640 N., west in the basin of the Vilyuy River to the upper Nizhnyaya Tunguska River, and east to the coast of the Sea of Okhotsk from Magadan south to the Khabarovsk Krai. It has been reported farther north, from the regions of the upper Kolyma River and the upper Anadyr. Eurasian eagle-owls are absent in Kamchatka and north of the Verkhoyansk Range. This is a large subspecies, rivaling the proceeding two subspecies as the largest of all eagle-owls, going on wing chord length, which subspecies is largest is unclear considering the extensive size overlap in wing size. The wing chord is 455 to 490 mm (17.9 to 19.3 in) in males and 480 to 503 mm (18.9 to 19.8 in) in females. B. b. jakutensis is much darker and browner above than both B. b. sibiricus and B. b. yenisseensis, though its coloration is more diffused, less sharp than the latter. It is more distinctly streaked and barred below than B. b. sibiricus while being whiter and more heavily vermiculated below than B. b. yenisseensis. This subspecies evidences an almost disheveled, wild appearance suggesting more than other races the fish owl group. B. b. jakutensis has more muted brown and conspicuously elongated feathers, somewhat looser hanging ear tufts and a bulky, large-headed and almost neckless look even for an eagle-owl.
- B. b. ussuriensis (Poljakov, 1915) – Would presumably be also known as the Ussuri eagle-owl. This subspecies ranges from southeastern Siberia, to the south of the range of B. b. jakutensis, southward through eastern Transbaikal, Amurland, Sakhalin, Ussuriland and the Manchurian portion of the Chinese provinces of Shaanxi, Shanxi and Hebei. This subspecies is also reportedly found in the southern Kuril Islands ranging down to as far as northern Hokkaido, the only Japanese representation in the Eurasian eagle-owl species, although this is apparently not a stable, viable population. Going on wing chord length, B. b. ussuriensis is slightly smaller than the various subspecies from further north in Siberia. Males have a wing chord length of 430–475 mm (16.9–18.7 in) and females are 460–502 mm (18.1–19.8 in). This subspecies differs from B. b. jakutensis by being much darker throughout. It is also darker than B. b. yenisseensis. The brown markings on the upper parts of B. b. ussuriensis are much more extensive and diffused than in B. b. jakutensis or B. b. yenisseensis, with the result that the white markings are much less conspicuous in B. b. ussuriensis than in the other two subspecies. The under parts are also more buffy, much less white, and more heavily streaked and vermiculated in B. b. ussuriensis than in the two more northerly, larger subspecies. It overlaps considerably with jakutensis and some birds are of an intermediate appearance.
- B. b. turcomanus (Eversmann, 1835) – Also known as the steppe eagle-owl. It is distributed from Kazakhstan between the Volga and upper Ural Rivers, the Caspian Sea coast and the former Aral Sea, but replaced in that country by B. b. omissus in the mountainous south and in the coastal region of the Mangyshlak Peninsula by B. b. gladkovi. Out of Kazakhstan, the range of B. b. turcomanus continues through the Transbaikal and the Tarim Basin to western Mongolia. This subspecies appears to be variable in size, but is generally medium-sized. Males can range in wing chord length from 418–468 mm (16.5–18.4 in) and females from 440 to 512 mm (17.3 to 20.2 in). In standard measurements, the tail is 260–310 mm (10–12 in), the tarsus is 77–81 mm (3.0–3.2 in) and the bill is 45–47 mm (1.8–1.9 in). This subspecies can reportedly weigh from 1.5 to 3.8 kg (3.3 to 8.4 lb). The plumage background colour is pale, yellowish-buff. The dark patterns on the upper- and underparts is paler, less well-defined and more shattered than in B. b. interpositus. Dark longitudinal patterning on the under-parts discontinue above the belly. B. b. turcomanus is greyer than B. b. hemalachanus but is otherwise somewhat similar-looking. This subspecies is unique in that it seems to shun mountainous and obvious rocky habitats in favor of low hills, plateaus, lowlands, steppes, and semideserts at or near sea-level.
- B. b. omissus (Dementiev, 1932) – May be also known as the Turkoman eagle-owl or the Turkmenian eagle-owl. B. b. omissus is native to Turkmenistan and adjacent regions of northeastern Iran and western Xinjiang. This is a small subspecies (only nikolskii averages smaller among currently accepted races), with males possessing a wing chord length of 404–450 mm (15.9–17.7 in) and females of 425 to 460 mm (16.7 to 18.1 in). B. b. omissus may be considered a typical sub-desert form. The general coloration is an ochre to buffy off-yellow; with the dark pattern on the upper- and under-parts being relatively undefined. The dark shaft-streaks on nape are very narrow, while the dark longitudinal patterning on the underparts does not cover the belly. A dark cross-pattern on the belly and flanks is thinner and paler than in B. b. turcomanus and some individuals may appear almost all pale below. Compared to B. b. nikolskii, which may occupy the more southern reaches of the same upland ranges, it is somewhat larger as well as darker, less distinctly yellowish and more heavily streaked.
- B. b. nikolskii (Zarudny, 1905) – May be also known in English as either the Afghan eagle-owl or the Iranian eagle-owl. The range of B. b. nikolskii appears to extend from the Balkan Mountains and Kopet Dagh in southern Transcaspia eastward to southeastern Uzbekistan or to perhaps southwestern Tadzhikistan, then southward 290 N. It may range north to Iran, Afghanistan and Baluchistan south to the region of Kalat, or at about latitude of Hindu Kush. In Iran, B. b. nikolskii is replaced by B. b. interpositus in the north, and probably also in the northwest, and probably by B. b. hemalachana in Badakhshan, part of northeastern Afghanistan. The birds of southern Tadzhikistan found west of the Pamirs are more or less intermediate between B. b. omissus and B. b. hemachalana. This is the smallest known subspecies of eagle-owl, though the only known measurements have been of wing chord length. Males can measure 378 to 430 mm (14.9 to 16.9 in) and females can measure 410 to 465 mm (16.1 to 18.3 in) in wing chord. Other than its smaller size, B. b. nikolskii is distinguished from the somewhat similar B. b. omissus by its rusty wash and being less dark above.
- B. b. hemachalana (Hume, 1873) – Also known as the Himalayan eagle-owl. The range of B. b. hemachalana extends from the Himalayas, from Pakistan through Jammu and Kashmir and Ladakh to at least Bhutan, also living in Tibet. Its range continues also westward to the Tian Shan system in Russian Turkestan, west to the Karatau, north to the Dzungarian Alatau, east to at least the Tekkes Valley in Xinjiang, and south to the regions of Kashgar, Yarkant and probably the western Kunlun Mountains. This bird is partly migratory, descending to the plains of Turkmenistan with colder winter weather, and apparently reaches northern Balochistan. This is a medium-sized subspecies, though it is larger than other potentially abutting arid Asian eagle-owl subspecies, which share a somewhat similar yellowish ground colour. The male attains a wing chord length of 420–485 mm (16.5–19.1 in), while the female's wing chord is 450–505 mm (17.7–19.9 in). The bill measures 4.2–4.5 cm (1.7–1.8 in) in length. 11 adult eagle-owls of the subspecies from the Tibetan Plateau averaged 301 mm (11.9 in) in tail length, 78 mm (3.1 in) in tarsus length and scaled an average of 2.16 kg (4.8 lb) in mass. This subspecies is physically similar to B. b. turcomanus but the background colour is more light yellowish-brown and less buff. The dark patterns on the upperparts and underparts are more expressed and less regular than in B. b. turcomanus and B. b. omissus and the general colour from the mantle to the ear tufts is a more consistent brownish colour than most other abutting races. B. b. hemachalana differs from B. b. yenisseensis by being much more yellow on the rump, under tail coverts, and outer tail feathers, rather than grayish or whitish, and the ground coloration of its body is more yellowish above, and is less whitish below. Dark longitudinal pattern on the under-parts cover the forebelly.
- B. b. kiautschensis (Reichenow, 1903) – This subspecies could be also known as the North Chinese eagle-owl. It ranges from South Korea and China, south of the range of B. b. ussuriensis, southward to Guangdong and Yunnan, and inland to Sichuan and southern Gansu. This is a smallish subspecies, with the male's wing chord measuring 410–448 mm (16.1–17.6 in) and the female's being 440–485 mm (17.3–19.1 in). In Korea, this subspecies was found to average 2.26 kg (5.0 lb) in mass, with a range of 1.8 to 2.9 kg (4.0 to 6.4 lb). B. b. kiautschensis is much darker, more tawny and rufous, and slightly smaller than B. b. ussuriensis. According to museum accounts, it resembles the nominate subspecies from Europe (though obviously considerably disparate in distribution) rather closely in coloration but differs from it by being paler, more mottled, and less heavily marked with brown on the upper parts, by having narrower dark shaft streaks on the under parts, which average also duller and more ocher, and by averaging smaller. Images from South Korea of captive and wild owls show, on the contrary, that this race may be easily as darkly marked as most nominate eagle-owls with a more rufous base colour altogether suggesting a richer and more dusky-colored eagle-owl than from almost any other population.
- B. b. swinhoei (Hartert, 1913) – This subspecies could be also known as the South Chinese eagle-owl. It is endemic to southeastern China. A quite rufescent form, it is somewhat similar to B. b. kiautschensis. In this smallish subspecies, the wing chord measures 41–46.5 cm (16.1–18.3 in) in both sexes. This is a rather poorly known and described subspecies and is considered invalid by some authorities.

== Habitat ==
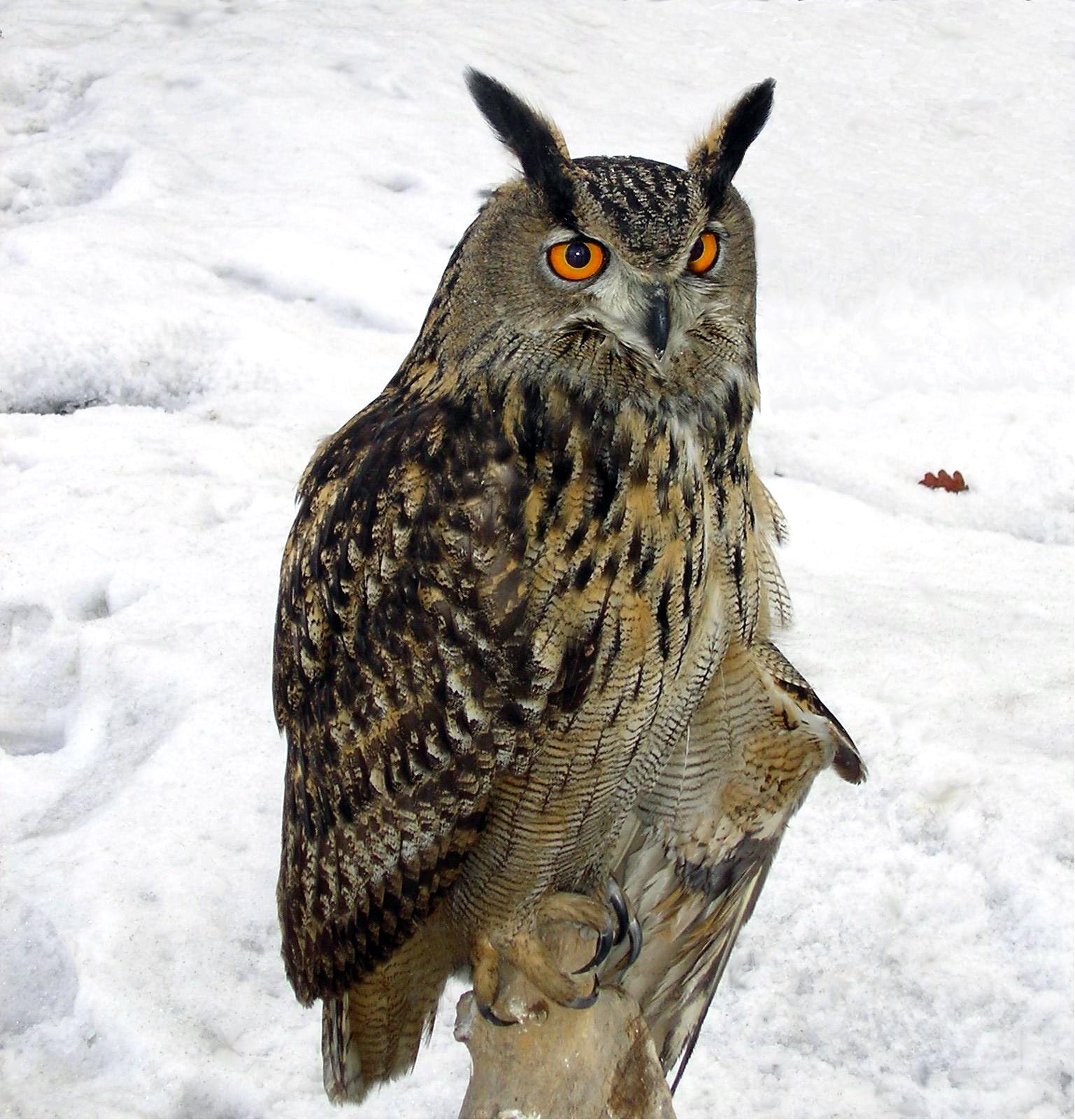
Eurasian eagle-owls are frequently at home in harsh wintry areas.

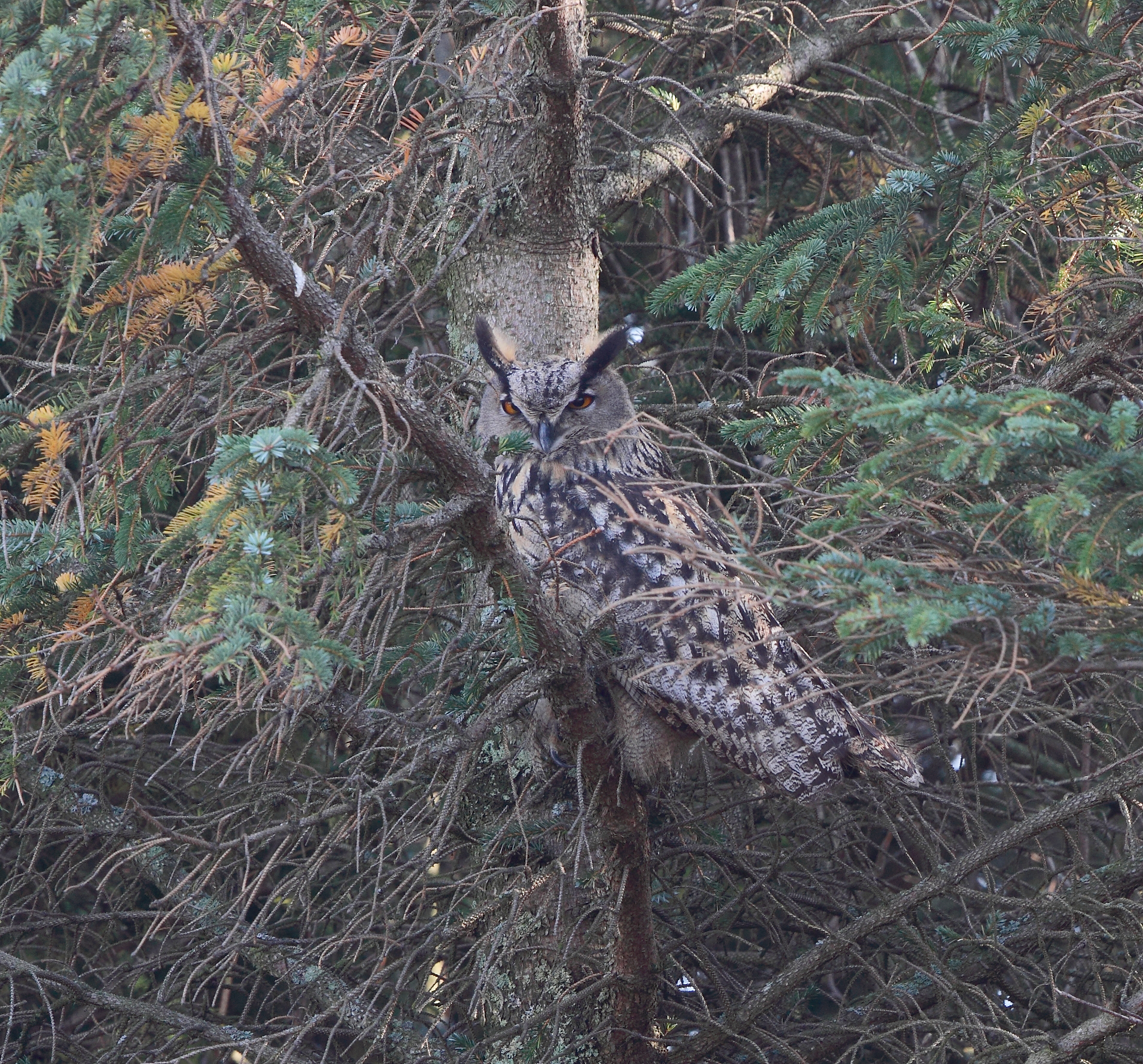
Eagle-owls often prefer areas with dense conifers for seclusion.

Eagle-owls are distributed somewhat sparsely, but can potentially inhabit a wide range of habitats, with a partiality for irregular topography. They have been found in habitats as diverse as northern coniferous forests to the edge of vast deserts. Essentially, Eurasian eagle-owls have been found living in almost every climatic and environmental condition on the Eurasian continent, excluding the greatest extremities, i.e. they are absent from humid rainforest in Southeast Asia, and the high Arctic tundra, both of which they are more or less replaced by other species of Bubo owls. They are often found in the largest numbers in areas where cliffs and ravines are surrounded by a scattering of trees and bushes. Grassland areas such as alpine meadows or desert-like steppe can also host them so long as they have the cover and protection of rocky areas. The preference of eagle-owls for places with irregular topography has been reported in most known studies. The obvious benefit of such nesting locations is that both nests and daytime roosts located in rocky areas and/or steep slopes would be less accessible to predators, including man. Also, they may be attracted to the vicinity of riparian or wetlands areas, because the soft soil of wet areas is conducive to burrowing by the small, terrestrial mammals normally preferred in the diet, such as voles and rabbits.

Due to their preference for rocky areas, the species is often found in mountainous areas, and can be found up to elevations of 2,100 m (6,900 ft) in the Alps, 4,500 m (14,800 ft) in the Himalayas, and 4,700 m (15,400 ft) in the adjacent Tibetan Plateau. They can also be found living at sea level and may nest amongst rocky sea cliffs. Despite their success in areas such as subarctic zones and mountains that are frigid for much of the year, warmer conditions seem to result in more successful breeding attempts per studies in the Eifel region of Germany. In a study from Spain, areas primarily consisting of woodlands (52% of study area being forested) were preferred with pine trees predominating the oaks in habitats used, as opposed to truly mixed pine-oak woodland. Pine and other coniferous stands are often preferred in great horned owls, as well, due to the constant density, which make overlooking the large birds more likely. In mountainous forest, they are not generally found in enclosed wooded areas, as is the tawny owl (Strix aluco), instead usually near forest edge. Only 2.7% of the habitat included in the territorial ranges for eagle-owls per the habitat study in Spain consisted of cultivated or agricultural land. Compared to golden eagles, though, they can visit cultivated land more regularly in hunting forays due to their nocturnal habits, which allow them to largely evade human activity. Other accounts make clear that farmland is only frequented where its less intensively farmed, holds more extensive treed and bushy areas, and often has limited to no irrigation; farmland areas with fallow or abandoned fields are more likely to hold more prey, so are prone to less frequent human disturbance. In the Italian Alps, almost no pristine habitat remained, and eagle-owls nested locally in the vicinity of towns, villages, and ski resorts.

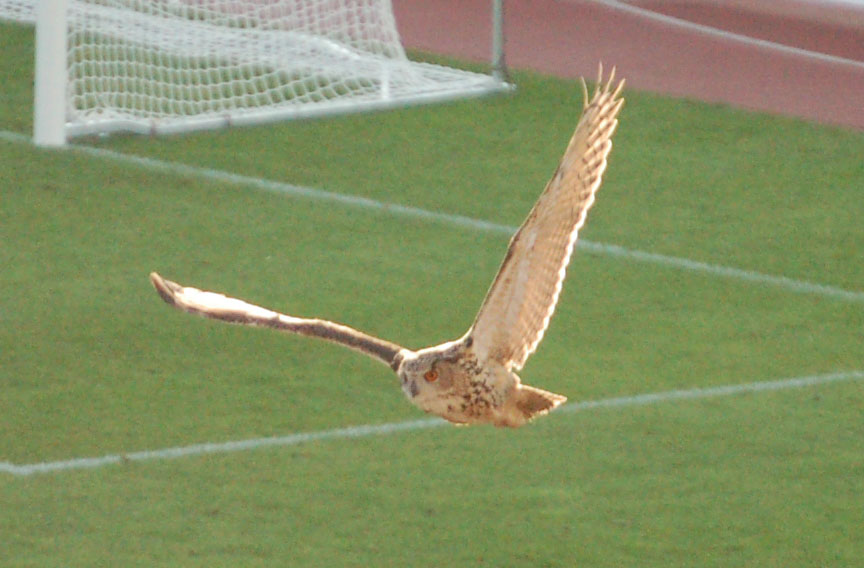
A wild eagle-owl in flight at the Olympic Stadium, Helsinki

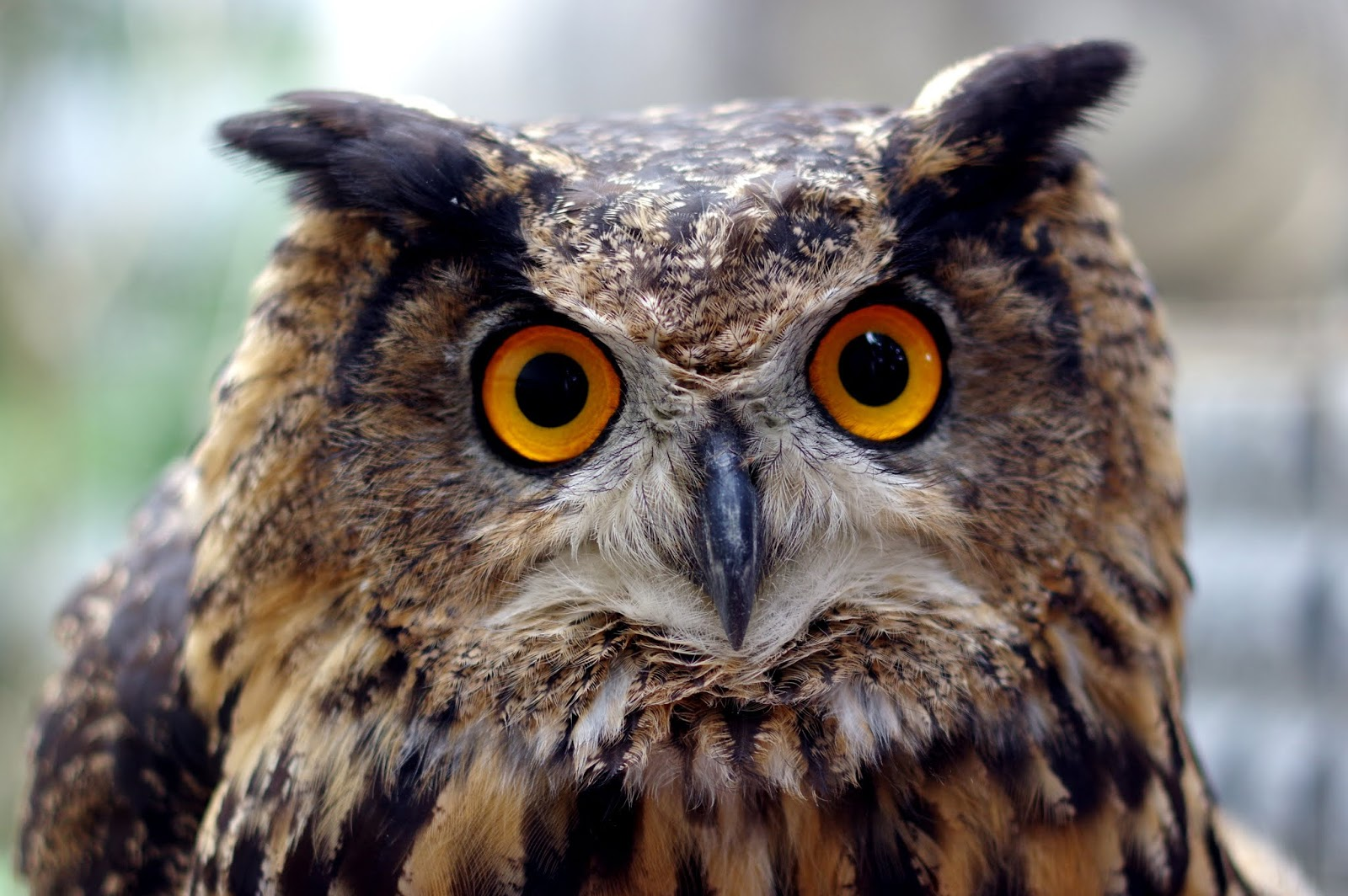
Bubo bubo

Although found in the largest numbers in areas sparsely populated by humans, farmland is sometimes inhabited, and they even have been observed living in park-like or other quiet settings within European cities. Since 2005, at least five pairs have nested in Helsinki. This is due in part to feral European rabbits (Oryctolagus cuniculus) having recently populated the Helsinki area, originally from pet rabbits released to the wild. The number is expected to increase due to the growth of the European rabbit population in Helsinki. European hares (Lepus europaeus), the often preferred prey species by biomass of the eagle-owls in their natural habitat, live only in rural areas of Finland, not in the city centre. In June 2007, an eagle-owl nicknamed 'Bubi' landed in the crowded Helsinki Olympic Stadium during the European Football Championship qualification match between Finland and Belgium. The match was interrupted for six minutes. After tiring of the match, following Jonathan Johansson's opening goal for Finland, the bird left the scene. Finland's national football team have had the nickname Huuhkajat (Finnish for "Eurasian eagle-owls") ever since. The owl was named "Helsinki Citizen of the Year" in December 2007. In 2020, a brood of three eagle-owl chicks was raised by their mother on a large, well-foliaged planter on an apartment window in the city centre of Geel, Belgium.

== Distribution ==
The Eurasian eagle-owl is one of the most widely distributed of all owl species, although it is far less wide-ranging than the short-eared owl (Asio flammeus) and long-eared owl and lacks the circumpolar range of boreal species such as great grey owl, boreal owl and northern hawk owl (Surnia ulula). This eagle-owl reaches its westernmost range in the Iberian Peninsula, both almost throughout Spain and more spottily in Portugal. From there, the Eurasian eagle-owl ranges widely in the south of France from Toulouse to Monaco and as far north into the central part of the country as in Allier. Farther north, they have spread into Luxembourg, southern and western Belgium and most of the Netherlands. It is infrequently found in southern and central United Kingdom. In Germany, the eagle-owl can be found in large but highly discontinuous areas, mostly in the south and central areas but is almost entirely absent in areas such as Brandenburg. Across from its south German range, this species range is nearly continuous into the Czech Republic, Slovakia, northern and eastern Hungary and very spottily into Poland. In the fairly montane countries of Switzerland and Austria, the eagle-owl can be found fairly broadly. In Italy, the Eurasian eagle-owl is found where the habitat is favourable in much of the northern, western and central portions down to as far south Melito di Porto Salvo. From Italy, this species sweeps quite broadly along the Mediterranean coast in Southeastern Europe from Slovenia mostly continuously to most of Greece and Bulgaria. In eastern Europe, the Eurasian eagle-owl is found essentially throughout from central Romania to Estonia. The species also occupies a majority of Finland and Scandinavia, where most broadly found in Norway, somewhat more spottily in Sweden and in Denmark it is found widely in Jutland (absent from the islands).

The Eurasian eagle-owl's range in Russia is truly massive, with the species apparently nearly unbound by habitat, with their distribution only excluding them from the true Arctic zone, i.e. their range stops around the tree line. If not the most densely populated species, they almost certainly stand as Russia's most widely distributed owl species. From Russia, they are found throughout Central Asia, residing continuously in each nation from Kazakhstan down to Afghanistan. In Asia Minor, they are found broadly in Georgia, Azerbaijan and somewhat so in western and southern Turkey but is quite sporadic in distribution overall in Turkey. A spotty range also exists in the Middle East in Syria, Iraq, Lebanon, Israel, Palestine, Jordan and western Iran, the species being found broadly only in north and western Iran. In South Asia, the Eurasian eagle-owl is found mostly often in northern Pakistan, northern Nepal and Bhutan and more marginally into far northern India. This species resides throughout Mongolia, almost the entirety of China (mainly absent only from southern Yunnan and southern Guangxi). From China and eastern Russia, the Eurasian eagle-owl is found throughout Korea, Sakhalin, the Kuril Islands and rarely into Japan in northern Hokkaido. Besides the Kurils, the farthest eastern part of the range for this species is in Magadan in the Russian Far East.

== Behaviour ==
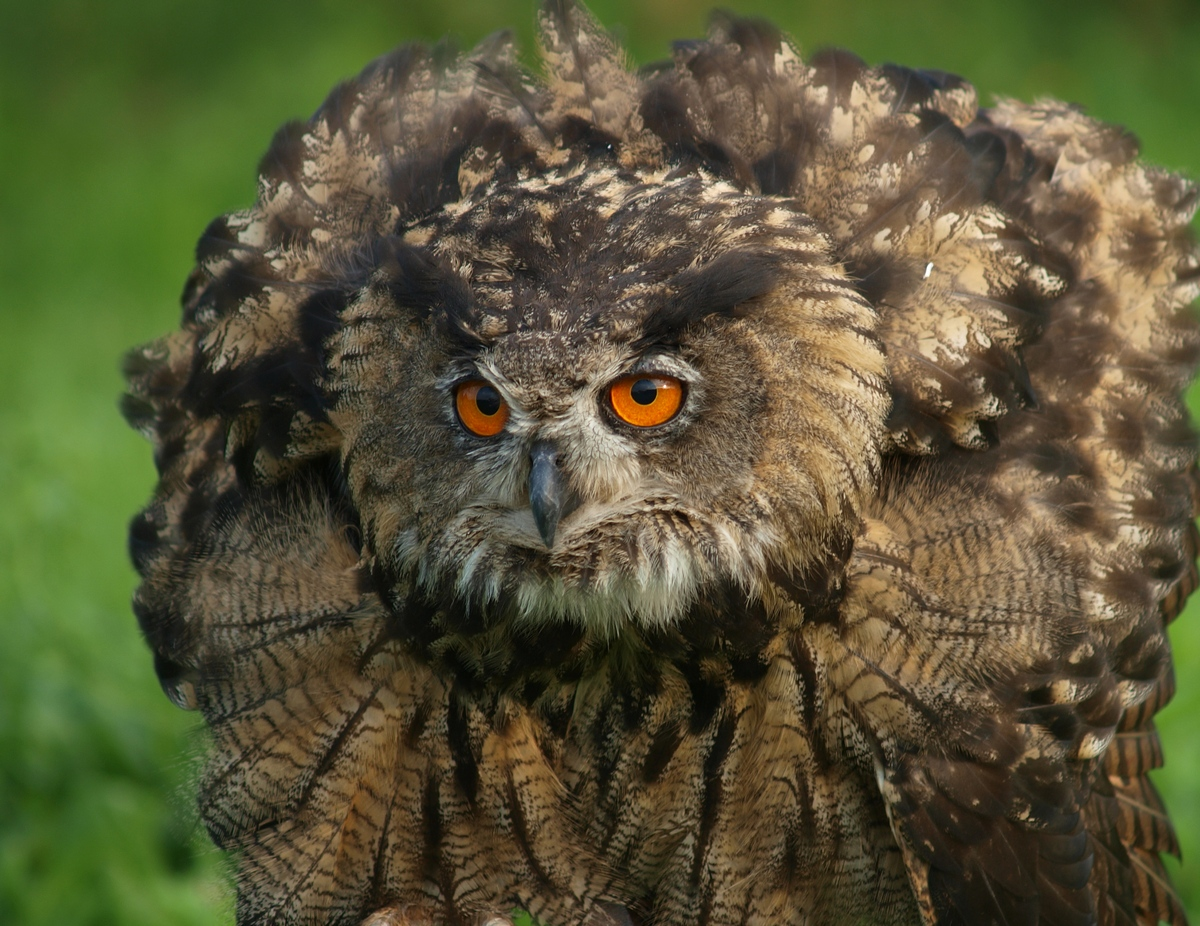
Threat posture

The Eurasian eagle-owl is largely nocturnal in activity, as are most owl species, with its activity focused in the first few hours after sunset and the last few hours before sunrise. In the northern stretches of its range, partial diurnal behaviour has been recorded, including active hunting in broad daylight during the late afternoon. In such areas, full nightfall is essentially non-existent at the peak of summer, so eagle-owls must presumably hunt and actively brood at the nest during daylight. The Eurasian eagle-owl has a number of vocalizations that are used at different times. It will usually select obvious topographic features such as rocky pinnacles, stark ridges and mountain peaks to use as regular song posts. These are dotted along the outer edges of the eagle-owl's territory and they are visited often but only for a few minutes at a time.

Vocal activity is almost entirely confined to the colder months from late fall through winter, with vocal activity in October through December mainly having territorial purposes and from January to February being primarily oriented towards courtship and mating purposes. Vocalizations in a Spanish study begin no sooner than 29 minutes after sunset and end no later than 55 minutes before sunrise. The territorial song, which can be heard at great distance, is a deep resonant ooh-hu with emphasis on the first syllable for the male, and a more high-pitched and slightly more drawn-out uh-hu for the female. It is not uncommon for a pair to perform an antiphonal duet. The widely used name in Germany as well as some other sections of Europe for this species is uhu due to its song. At 250–350 Hz, the Eurasian eagle-owls territorial song or call is deeper, farther-carrying and is often considering "more impressive" than the territorial songs of the great horned owl or even that of the slightly larger Blakiston's fish owl, although the horned owl's call averages slightly longer in duration and the Blakiston's call is typically deeper. Other calls include a rather faint, laughter-like OO-OO-oo and a harsh kveck-kveck. Intruding eagle-owls and other potential dangers may be met with a "terrifying", extremely loud hooo. Raucous barks not unlike those of ural owls or long-eared owls have been recorded but are deeper and more powerful than those species' barks. Annoyance at close quarters is expressed by bill-clicking and cat-like spitting, and a defensive posture involves lowering the head, ruffling the back feathers, fanning the tail and spreading the wings.

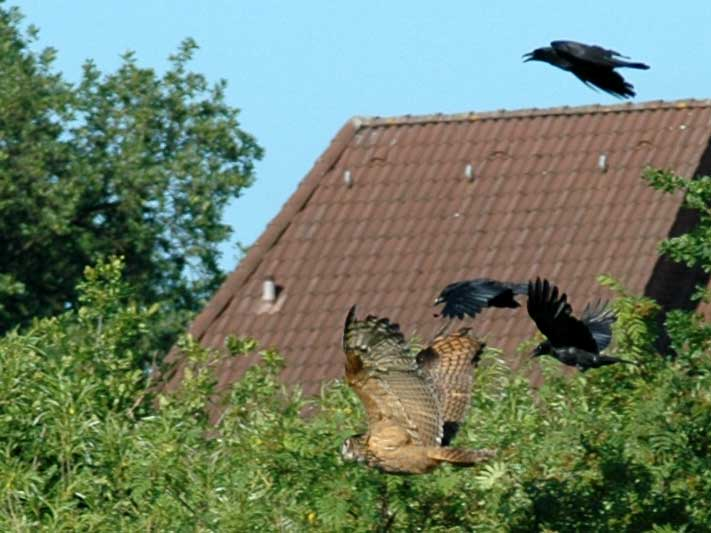
Eurasian eagle-owls are subject to frequent mobbing by crows – the owl in this photograph is being pursued by a group of carrion crows (Corvus corone).

The Eurasian eagle-owl rarely assumes the so-called "tall-thin position", which is when an owl adopts an upright stance with plumage closely compressed and may stand tightly beside a tree trunk. Among others, the long-eared owl is among the most often reported to sit with this pose. The great horned owl has been more regularly recorded using the tall-thin, if not as consistently as some Strix and Asio owls, and it is commonly thought to aid camouflage if encountering a threatening or novel animal or sound. The Eurasian eagle-owl is a broad-winged species and engages in a strong, direct flight, usually consisting of shallow wing beats and long, surprisingly fast glides. It has, unusually for an owl, also been known to soar on updrafts on rare occasions. The latter method of flight has led them to be mistaken for Buteos, which are smaller and quite differently proportioned. Usually when seen flying during the day, it is due to being disturbed or displaced from its roost by humans or mobbing animals, such as crows. Eurasian eagle-owls are highly sedentary, normally maintaining a single territory throughout their adult lives.

Eurasian eagle-owl are considered a completely non-migratory bird, as are all members of the Bubo genus excluding the snowy owl. Even those near the northern limits of their range, where winters are harsh and likely to bear little in food, the eagle-owl does not leave its native range. In 2020, a study presented evidence of a short distance distribution by adult eagle-owls in the fall subsequent to breeding, with 5 adults found to move over 20 km (12 mi) away from their nests. There are additionally claimed cases from Russia of Eurasian eagle-owls moving south for the winter, as the icebound, infamously harsh climate there may be too severe even for these hardy birds and their prey. Similarly, Eurasian eagle-owls living in the Tibetan highlands and Himalayas may in some anecdotal cases vacate their normal territories when winter hits and move south. In both of those examples, these are old, unverified reports and there is no evidence whatsoever of consistent, annual migration by Eurasian eagle-owls and the birds may eke out a living on their normal territories even in the sparsest times.

== Breeding ==
Footage of an adult tending to a nest with juveniles

=== Territoriality ===
Eurasian eagle-owls are strictly territorial and will defend their territories from interloping eagle-owls year around, but territorial calling appears to peak around October to February. Territory size is similar or occasionally slightly greater than great horned owl: averaging 15 to 80 km^{2} (5.8 to 30.9 sq mi). Territories are established by the male eagle-owl, who select the highest points in the territory from which to sing. The high prominence of singing perches allows their song to be heard at greater distances and lessens the need for potentially dangerous physical confrontations in the areas where territories may meet. Nearly as important in territorial behaviour as vocalization is the white throat patch. When taxidermied specimens with flared white throats were placed around the perimeter of eagle-owl territories, male eagle-owls reacted quite strongly and often attacked the stuffed owl, reacting more mildly to a stuffed eagle-owl with a non-flared white throat. Females were less likely to be aggressive to mounted specimens and did not seem to vary in their response whether exposed to the specimens with or without the puffed up white patch. In January and February, the primary function for vocalization becomes for the purpose of courtship. More often than not, eagle-owls will pair for life but usually engage in courtship rituals annually, most likely to re-affirm pair bonds. When calling for the purposes of courtship, males tend to bow and hoot loudly but do so in a less contorted manner than the male great horned owl. Courtship in the Eurasian eagle-owl may involve bouts of "duetting", with the male sitting upright and the female bowing as she calls. There may be mutual bowing, billing and fondling before the female flies to a perch where reproduction occurs, usually taking place several times over the course of a few minutes.

=== Nests ===
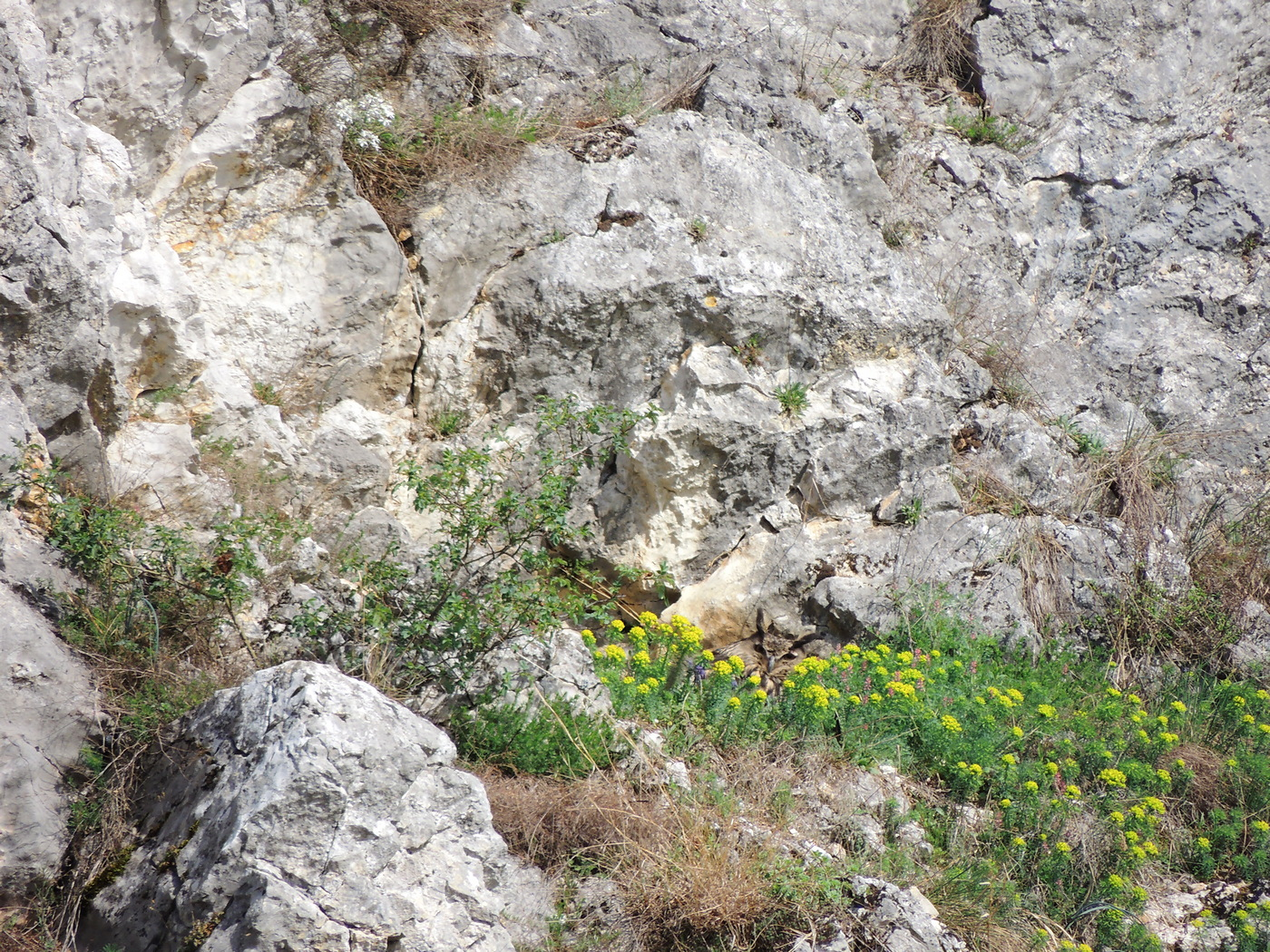
A female incubating on a nest fairly well obscured behind wild flowers.

The male selects breeding sites and advertises their potential to the female by flying to them and kneading out a small depression (if soil is present) and making staccato notes and clucking noises. Several potential sites may be presented, with the female selecting one. In Baden-Württemberg, Germany, the amount of male nest site visits were found to increase in time spent over the pre-laying breeding season from a mean of 29 minutes to 3 hours with frequent incubation like sitting by the male. Like all owls, Eurasian eagle-owls do not build nests or add material but nest on the surface or material already present. Eurasian eagle-owls normally nest on rocks or boulders, most often utilizing cliff ledges and steep slopes, as well as crevices, gullies, holes or caves. Rocky areas that also prove concealing woodlots as well as, for hunting purposes, that border river valleys and grassy scrubland may be especially attractive. If only low rubble is present, they will nest on the ground between rocks. Often, in more densely forested areas, they've been recorded nesting on the ground, often among roots of trees, under large bushes and under fallen tree trunks. Steep slopes with dense vegetation are preferred if nesting on the ground, although some ground nests are surprisingly exposed or in flat spots such as in open spots of the taiga, steppe, ledges of river banks and between wide tree trunks. All Eurasian eagle-owl nests in the largely forested Altai Krai region of Russia were found to be on the ground, usually at the base of pines. This species does not often use other bird's nests as does the great horned owl, which often prefers nests built by other animals over any other nesting site. The Eurasian eagle-owl has been recorded in singular cases using nests built by common buzzards (Buteo buteo), golden eagle, greater spotted (Clanga clanga) and white-tailed eagles (Haliaeetus albicilla), common ravens (Corvus corax) and black storks (Ciconia nigra). Among the eagle-owls of the fairly heavily wooded wildlands of Belarus, they more commonly utilize nests built by other birds than most eagle-owls, i.e. stork or accipitrid nests, but a majority of nests are still located on the ground. This is contrary to the indication that ground nests are selected only if rocky areas or other bird nests are unavailable, as many will utilize ground nests even where large bird nests seem to be accessible. Tree holes being used for nesting sites are even more rarely recorded than nests constructed by other birds. While it may be assumed that the eagle-owl is too large to utilize tree hollows, when other large species like the great grey owl have never been recorded nesting in one, the even more robust Blakiston's fish owl nests exclusively in cavernous hollows. The Eurasian eagle-owl often uses the same nest site year after year.

=== Parental behaviour ===
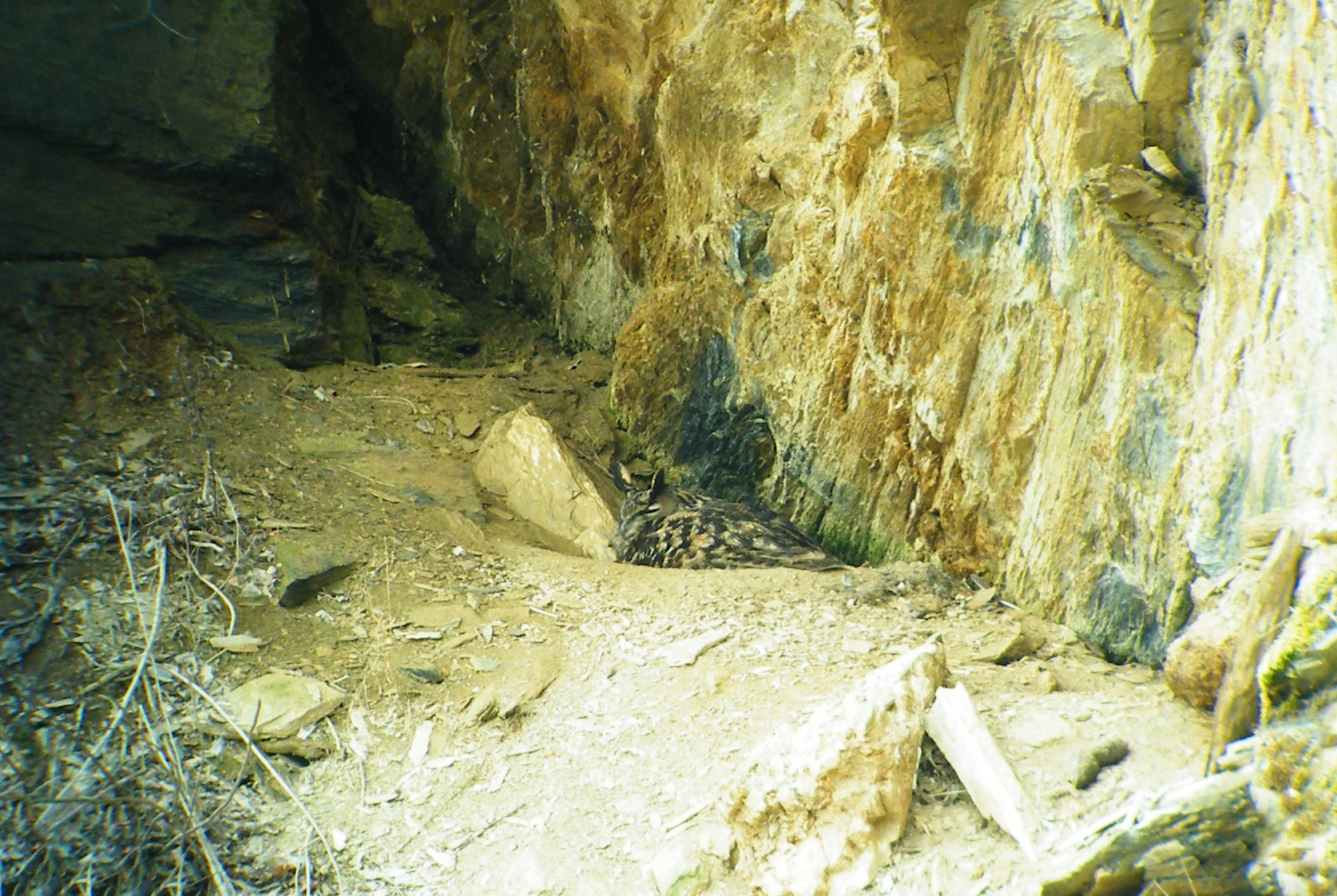
A brooding female on nest

In Engadin, Switzerland, the male eagle-owl alone hunts until the young are 4 to 5 weeks old and the female spends all her time brooding at the nest. After this point, the female gradually resumes hunting from both herself and the young and thus provides a greater range of food for the young. While it may seem contrary to the species' highly territorial nature, there is one verified cases of polygamy in Germany, with a male apparently mating with two females, and cooperative brooding in Spain, with a third adult of undetermined sex helping a breeding pair care for the chicks. The response of Eurasian eagle-owls to humans approaching at the nest is quite variable. The species is often rather less aggressive than some other owls, including related species like the spot-bellied eagle-, great horned and snowy owls, many of the northern Strix species, and even some rather smaller owl species, which often fearlessly attack any person found to be nearing their nests. Occasionally, if a person climbs to an active nest, the adult female eagle-owl will do a distraction display, in which they feign an injury. This is an uncommon behavior in most owls and is most often associated with small birds trying to falsely draw the attention of potential predators away from their offspring. More commonly, the adults withdraw to a safe distance, as their nests are usually well-camouflaged. Occasionally if cornered both adults and nestlings will do an elaborate threat display, also rare in owls in general, in which the eagle-owls raise their wings into a semi-circle and puff up their feathers, followed by a snapping of their bills. Apparently, eagle-owls of uncertain and probably exotic origin in Britain are likely to react aggressively to humans approaching the nest. Also, aggressive encounters involving eagle-owls around their nest, despite being historically uncommon, apparently have increased in recent decades in Scandinavia. The discrepancy of aggressiveness at the nest between the Eurasian eagle-owl and its Nearctic counterpart may be correlated to variation in the extent of nest predation that the species endured during the evolutionary process.

=== Eggs and offspring development ===
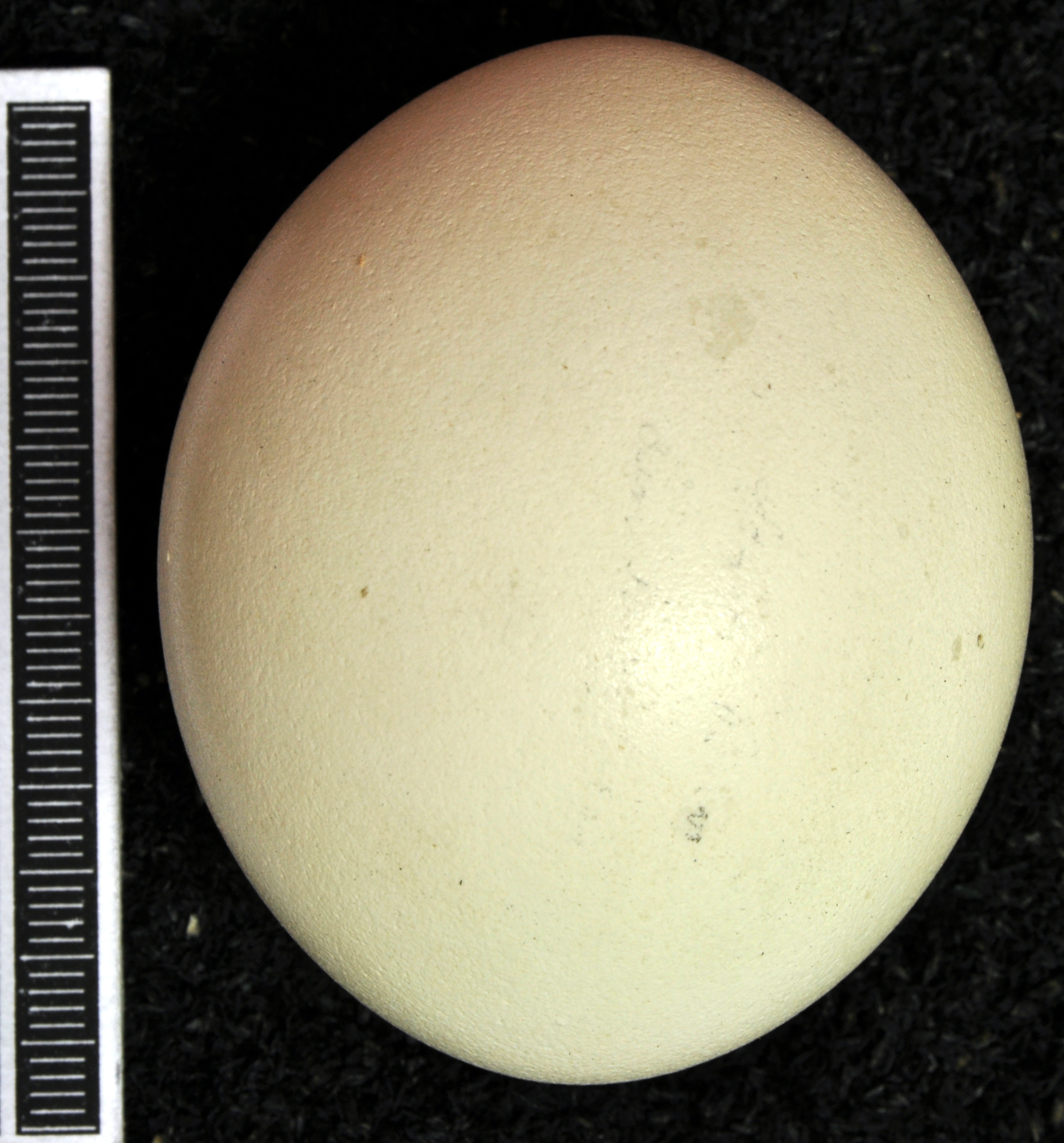
Egg, Museum Wiesbaden

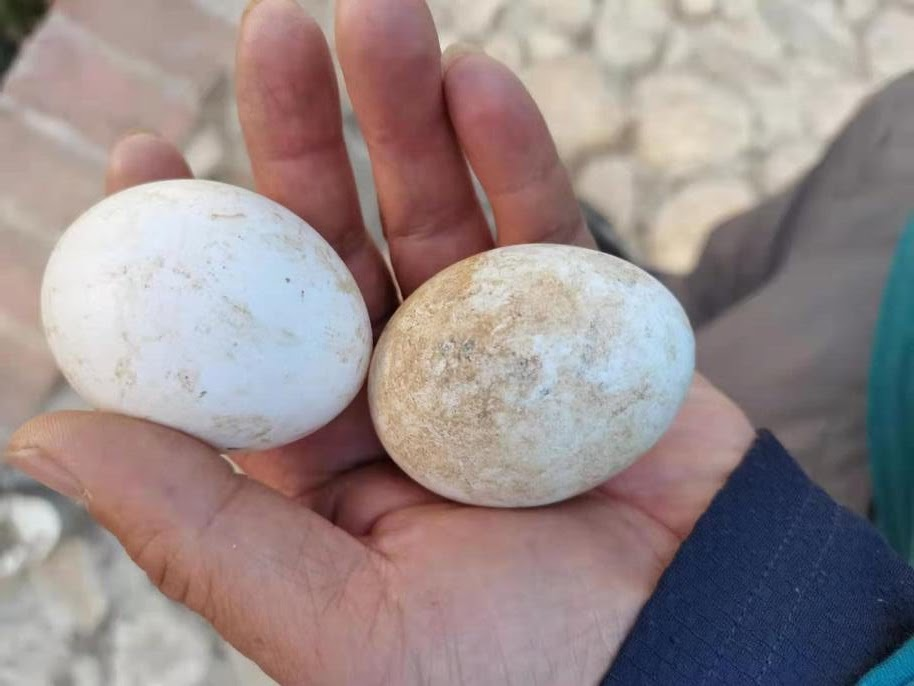
Bubo bubo eggs

The eggs are normally laid at intervals of three days and are incubated only by the female. Laying generally begins in late winter but may be later in the year in colder habitats. During the incubation period, the female is brought food at the nest by her mate. A single clutch of white eggs is laid; each egg can measure from 56 to 73 mm (2.2 to 2.9 in) long by 44.2 to 53 mm (1.74 to 2.09 in) in width, and will usually weigh about 75 to 80 g (2.6 to 2.8 oz). In Central Europe, eggs average 59.8 mm × 49.5 mm (2.35 in × 1.95 in), and in Siberia, eggs average 59.4 mm × 50.1 mm (2.34 in × 1.97 in). Their eggs are only slightly larger than those of snowy owls and the nominate subspecies of great horned owl, while similar in size to those of spot-bellied eagle-owls and Blakiston's fish owls. The Eurasian eagle-owl's eggs are noticeably larger than those of Indian eagle-owl and pharaoh eagle-owls. Usually clutch size is one or two, rarely three or four, and exceptionally to six. The average number of eggs laid varies with latitude in Europe. Clutch size ranges from 2.02 to 2.14 in Spain and the massifs of France, and 1.82 to 1.89 in central Europe and the eastern Alps; in Sweden and Finland, the mean clutch size is 1.56 and 1.87, respectively. While variation based on climate is not unusual for different wide-ranging palearctic species, the higher clutch size of western Mediterranean eagle-owls is also probably driven by the presence of lagomorphs in the diet, which provide high nutritional value than most other regular prey. The average clutch size, attributed as 2.7, was the lowest of any European owl per one study. One species was attributed with an even lower clutch size in North America, the great grey owl with a mean of 2.6, but the mean clutch size was much higher for the same species in Europe, at 4.05.

In Spain, incubation is from mid-January to mid-March, hatching and early nestling period is from late March to early April, fledging and postfledging dependence can range from mid-April to August, and territorial/courtship is anytime hereafter; i.e. the period between the beginning of juvenile dispersal to egg laying; from September to early January. The same general date parameters were followed in southern France. In the Italian Alps, the mean egg-laying date was similarly February 27, but the young were more likely to be dependent later, as all fledglings were still being cared for by the end of August, and some even lingered under parental care until October. In northern climes, the breeding season shifts somewhat later by as much as a month so that egg laying may be as late as late March or early April. Nonetheless, the Eurasian eagle-owl is one of the earliest nesting bird species in Europe or northern, temperate Asia.

The first egg hatches after 31 to 36 days of incubation. The eggs hatch successively; although the average interval between egg-laying is 3 days, the young tend to hatch no more than a day or two apart. Like all owls that nest in the open, the downy young are often a mottled grey with some white and buff, which provides camouflage. They open their eyes at 4 days of age. The chicks grow rapidly, being able to consume small prey whole after roughly 3 weeks. In Andalusia, the most noticeable development of the young before they leave the nest was the increase of body size, which was the highest growth rate of any studied owl and faster than either snowy or great horned owls. Body mass increased fourteen times over from 5 days old to 60 days old in this study. The male continues to bring prey, leaving it on or around the nest, and the female feeds the nestlings, tearing up the food into suitably sized pieces. The female resumes hunting after about 3 weeks, which increases the food supply to the chicks. Many nesting attempts produce two fledglings, indicating that siblicide is not as common as in other birds of prey, especially a few species of eagles. In Spain, males are thought to be the first egg laid to reduce the likelihood of sibling aggression due to the size difference, thus the younger female hatchling is less likely to be killed since it is similar in size to its older sibling.

Apparently, the point at which the chicks venture out of the nest is driven by the location of the nest. In elevated nest sites, chicks usually wander out of the nest at 5 to as late as 7 weeks of age, but have been recorded leaving the nest if the nest is on the ground as early as 22 to 25 days old. The chicks can walk well at 5 weeks of age and by 7 weeks are taking short flights. Hunting and flying skills are not tested prior to the young eagle-owls leaving the nest. Young Eurasian eagle-owls leave the nest by 5–6 weeks of age and typically can be flying weakly (a few metres) by about 7–8 weeks of age. Normally, they are cared for at least another month. By the end of the month, the young eagle-owls are quite assured fliers. A few cases have been confirmed of adult eagle-owls in Spain feeding and caring for postfledgling juvenile eagle-owls that were not their own.

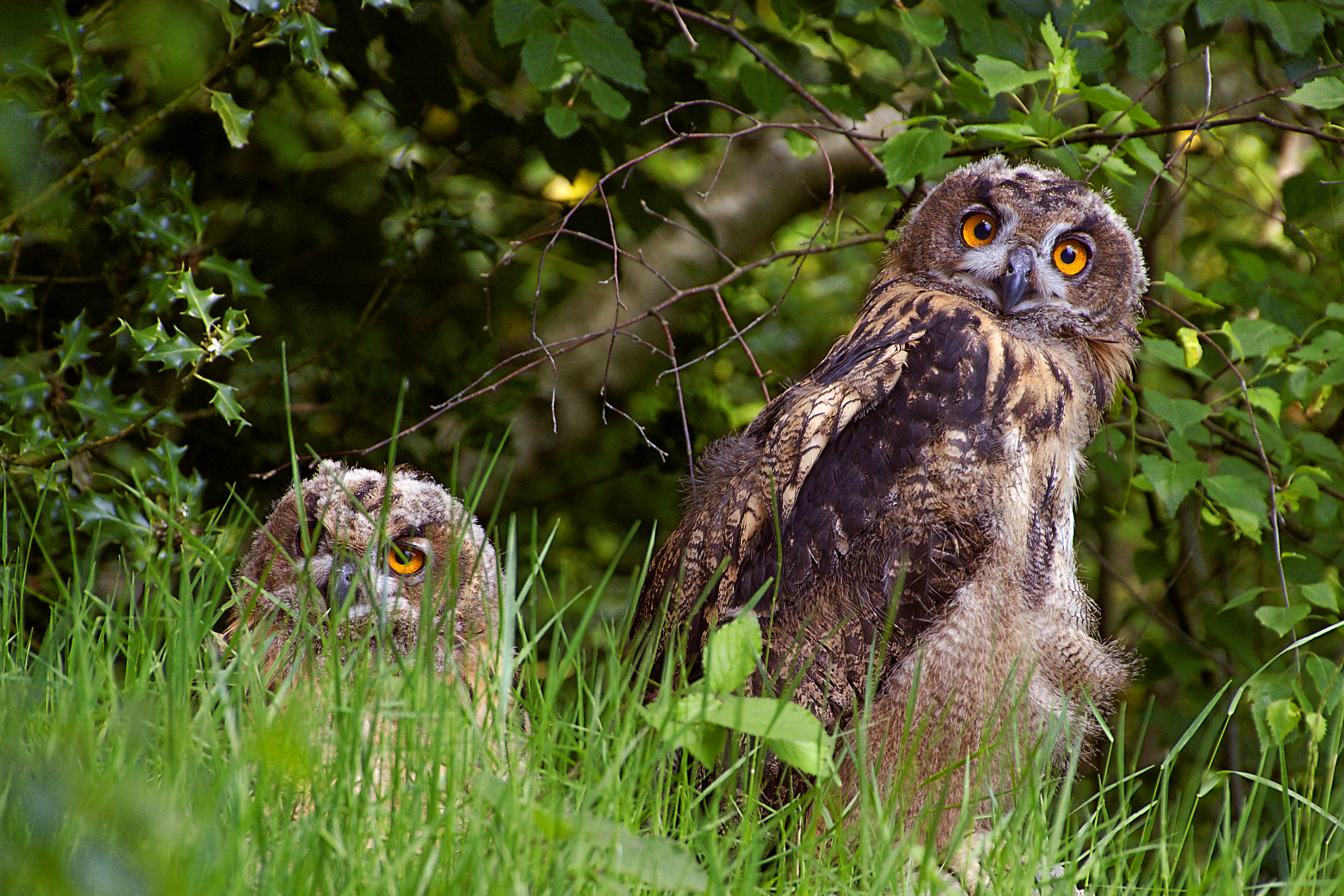
Like many large owls, Eurasian eagle-owls leave the nest while still in a functionally flightless state and with large amounts of second down still present, but will fly shortly thereafter.

A study from southern France found the mean number of fledglings per nest was 1.67. In central Europe, the mean number of fledglings per nest was between 1.8 and 1.9. The mean fledgling rate in the Italian Alps was 1.89, thus being similar. In the Italian Alps, heavier rainfall during breeding decreased fledgling success because it inhibited the ability of the parents to hunt and potentially exposed nestlings to hypothermia. In the reintroduced population of eagle-owls in Eifel, Germany, occupied territories produced an average of 1.17 fledglings, but not all occupying pairs attempted to breed, with about 23% of those attempting to breed being unsuccessful. In slightly earlier studies, possibly due to higher persecution rates, the mean number of young leaving the nest was often lower, such as 1.77 in Bavaria, Germany, 1.1 in lower Austria, and 0.6 in southern Sweden. An experimental supplemental feeding program to young eagle-owls on two small Norwegian islands were found to increase mean numbers of fledglings from a mean of about 1.2 to 1.7 despite evidence that increased human activity near the nest decreased owlet survivability. While sibling owls are close in the stage between leaving the nest and fully fledged, about 20 days after leaving the nest, the family unit seems to dissolve and the young disperse quickly and directly. All told, the dependence of young eagle-owls on their parents lasts for 20 to 24 weeks. Independence in central Europe is from September to November. The young leave their parents' care normally on their own, but are also sometimes chased away by their parents. The young Eurasian eagle-owls reach sexual maturity by the following year, but do not normally breed until they can establish a territory at around 2–3 years old. Until they are able to establish their own territories, young eagle-owls spend their lives as nomadic "floaters", and while they also call, select inconspicuous perch sites unlike breeding birds. Male floaters are especially wary about intrusion into an established territory to avoid potential conspecific aggression.

== Status ==
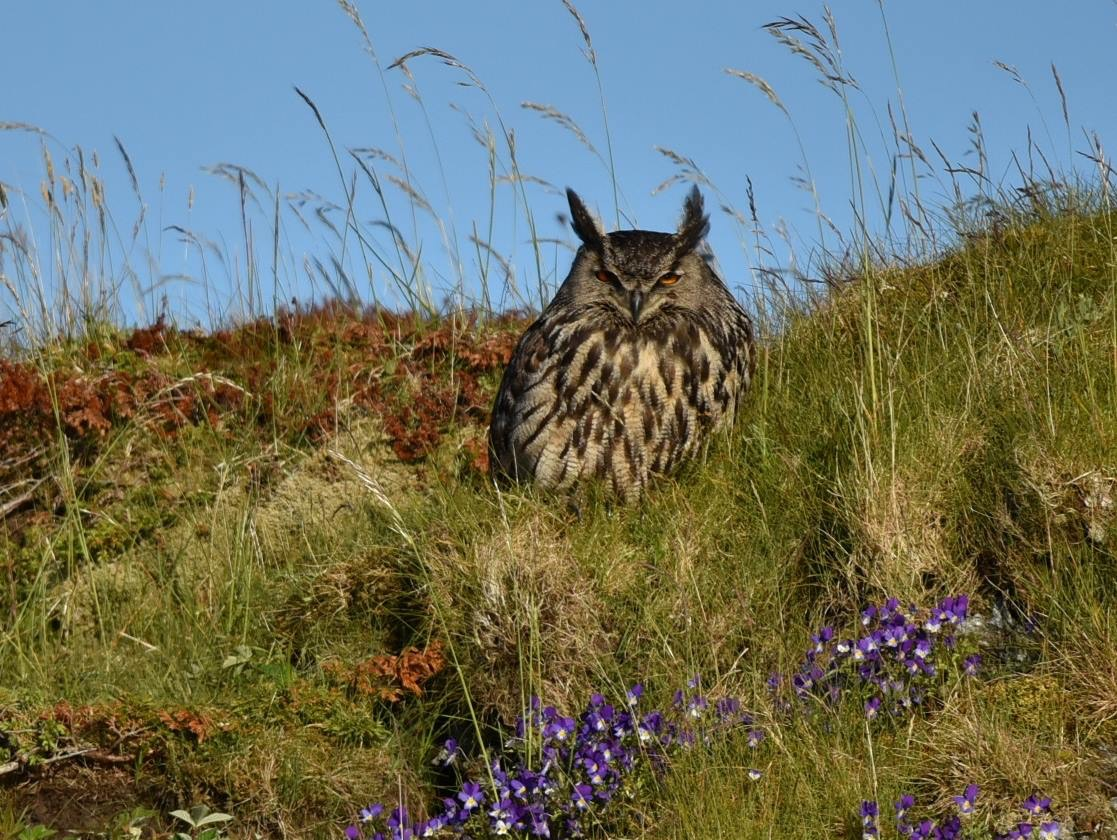
Europe's highest density of Eurasian eagle-owl is reportedly in the Svolvær district of Norway.

The Eurasian eagle-owl has a very wide range across much of Europe and Asia, estimated to be about 32,000,000 km^{2} (12,000,000 sq mi). In Europe, the population is estimated at 19,000 to 38,000 breeding pairs, and in the whole world around 250,000 to 2,500,000 individual birds. The population trend is thought to be decreasing because of human activities, but with such a large range and large total population, the International Union for Conservation of Nature has rated the bird as being of least concern. Although roughly equal in adaptability and wideness of distribution, the great horned owl, with a total estimated population up to 5.3 million individuals, apparently has a total population that is roughly twice that of the Eurasian eagle-owl. Numerous factors, including a shorter history of systematic persecution, lesser sensitivity to human disturbance while nesting, somewhat greater ability to adapt to marginal habitats and widespread urbanization, and slightly smaller territories may play into the horned owls greater numbers in modern times. Eurasian eagle-owls are listed in Appendix II of the Convention on International Trade in Endangered Species (CITES) meaning international trade (including in parts and derivatives) is regulated.

=== Longevity ===
The Eurasian eagle-owl is one of the longest-living owls. It can live for up to 20 years in the wild. A 19-year-old was once considered the oldest ringed eagle-owl. Some studies posited that, in protected areas, lifespans ranging 15–20 years may not be uncommon. A record-breaking specimen, was banded in the wild and later encountered at the age of 27 years and 9 months. Like many other bird species, they can live much longer in captivity, where they don't endure difficult natural conditions. They may have survived up to 68 years in zoo collections. Healthy adults normally have no natural predators, thus are considered apex predators. The leading causes of death are man-made: electrocution, traffic accidents, and shooting frequently claim the lives of eagle-owls.

=== Anthropogenic mortality ===
Electrocution was the greatest cause of mortality in 68% of 25 published studies, and accounted, on average, for 38.2% of the reported eagle-owl deaths. This was particularly true in the Italian Alps, where the number of dangerous, uninsulated pylons near nests was extremely high, but is highly problematic almost throughout the species' European distribution. In one telemetry study, 55% of 27 dispersing young were electrocuted within 1 year of their release from captivity, while electrocution rates of wild-born young are even higher. Mortality in the Swiss Rhine Valley was variable, in radio-tagged, released individuals, most died as a result of starvation (48%) rather than human-based causes, but 93% of the wild, untagged individuals found dead were due to human activities, 46% due to electrocution, and 43% due to collision with vehicles or trains. Insulation of pylons is thought to result in a stabilisation of the local population due to floaters taking up residence in unoccupied territories that formerly held deceased eagle-owls. Eurasian eagle-owls from Finland were found mainly to die due to electrocution (39%) and collisions with vehicles (22%). Wind turbine collisions can also be a serious cause of mortality locally.

Eagle-owls have been singled out historically as a threat to game species, thus to the economic well-being of landowners, game-keepers, and even governmental agencies, and as such, have been singled out for widespread persecution. Local extinctions of Eurasian eagle-owls have been primarily due to persecution. Examples of this include northern Germany in 1830, the Netherlands sometimes in the late 19th century, Luxembourg in 1903, Belgium in 1943, and central and western Germany in the 1960s. In trying to determine causes of death for 1476 eagle-owls from Spain, most were unknown and undetermined types of trauma. The largest group that could be determined, 411 birds, was due to collisions, more than half of which were from electrocution, while 313 were due to persecution, and merely 85 were directly attributable to natural causes. Clearly, while pylon safety is perhaps the most serious factor to be addressed in Spain, persecution continues to be a massive problem for Spanish eagle-owls. Of seven European nations where modern Eurasian eagle-owl mortality is well-studied, continual persecution is by far the largest problem in Spain, although also continues to be serious (often comprising at least half of studied mortality) in France. From France and Spain, nearly equal numbers of eagle-owls are poisoned (for which raptors might not be the main target), or shot intentionally.

=== Conservation and reintroductions ===
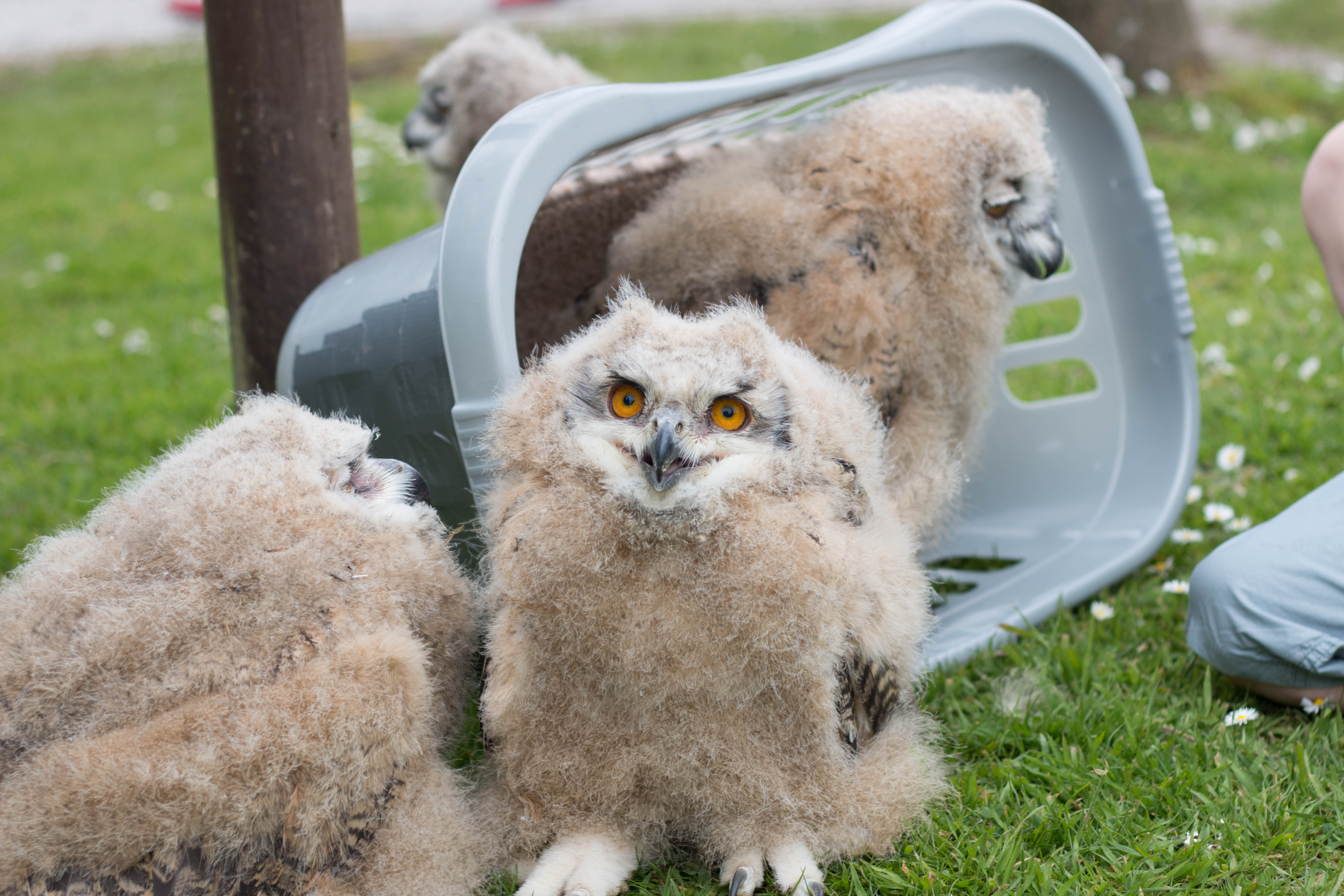
Siberian eagle-owl chicks in captivity

While the eagle-owl remains reasonably numerous in some parts of its habitat where nature is still relatively little disturbed by human activity, such as the sparsely populated regions of Russia and Scandinavia, concern has been expressed about the future of the Eurasian eagle-owl in Western and Central Europe. There, very few areas are not heavily modified by human civilisation, thus exposing the birds to the risk of collisions with deadly man-made objects (e.g. pylons) and a depletion of native prey numbers due to ongoing habitat degradation and urbanisation.

In Spain, long-term governmental protection of the Eurasian eagle-owl seems to have no positive effect on reducing the persecution of eagle-owls. Therefore, Spanish conservationists have recommended to boost education and stewardship programs to protect eagle-owls from direct killing by local residents. Unanimously, biologists studying eagle-owl mortality and conservation factors have recommended to proceed with the proper insulation of electric wires and pylons in areas where the species is present. As this measure is labour-intensive and therefore rather expensive, few efforts have actually been made to insulate pylons in areas with few fiscal resources devoted to conservation such as rural Spain. In Sweden, a mitigation project was launched to insulate transformers that are frequently damaged by eagle-owl electrocution.

Large reintroduction programs were instituted in Germany after the eagle-owl was deemed extinct in the country as a breeding species by the 1960s, as a result of a long period of heavy persecution. The largest reintroduction there occurred from the 1970s to the 1990s in the Eifel region, near the border with Belgium and Luxembourg. The success of this measure, consisting in more than a thousand eagle-owls being reintroduced at an average cost of US$1,500 per bird, is a subject of controversy. Those eagle-owls reintroduced in the Eifel region appear to be able to breed successfully, and enjoy nesting success comparable with wild eagle-owls from elsewhere in Europe. Mortality levels in the Eifel region, though, appear to remain quite high due to anthropogenic factors. Also, concerns exist about a lack of genetic diversity of the species in this part of Germany. Apparently, the German reintroductions have allowed eagle-owls to repopulate neighbouring parts of Europe, as the breeding populations now occurring in the Low Countries (the Netherlands, Belgium, and Luxembourg) are believed to be the result of influx from regions further to the east. Smaller reintroductions have been done elsewhere, and the current breeding population in Sweden is believed to be primarily the result of a series of reintroductions. Conversely to numerous threats and declines incurred by Eurasian eagle-owls, areas where human-dependent, non-native prey species such as brown rats (Rattus norvegicus) and rock doves (Columba livia) have flourished, have given the eagle-owls a primary food source and allowed them occupy regions where they were once marginalized or absent.

=== Occurrence in Great Britain ===
The Eurasian eagle-owl at one time occurred naturally in Great Britain. Some, including the RSPB, have claimed that it had disappeared about 10,000–9,000 years ago, after the last ice age, but fossil remains found in Meare Lake Village indicate the eagle-owl occurring as recently as roughly 2,000 years ago in the fossil record. The lack of presence of the Eurasian eagle-owl in British folklore or writings in recent millennium may indicate the lack of occurrence by this species there. The flooding of the land bridge between Britain and continental Europe may have been responsible for their extirpation as they only disperse over limited distances, although early human persecution presumably played a role as well. Some reportages of eagle-owls in Britain have been revealed to actually be great horned owls or Indian eagle-owls, the latter a particularly popular owl in falconry circuits. Some breeding pairs do still occur in Britain, though the exact number of pairs and individuals is not definitely known. The World Owl Trust stated that they believe some eagle-owls occurring in North England and Scotland are naturally occurring, making the flight of roughly 350 to 400 km (220 to 250 mi) from the west coast of Norway to Shetland and the east coast of Scotland, as well as possibly from the coasts of the Netherlands and Belgium to the south. Although not migratory, eagle-owls can disperse some notable distances in young birds seeking a territory.

Prior studies of eagle-owl distribution have indicated a strong reluctance to cross large bodies of water in the species. Many authorities state that the Eurasian eagle-owls occurring in Britain are individuals that have escaped from captivity. While, until the 19th century, wealthy collectors may have released unwanted eagle-owls, despite press to the contrary, no evidence of any organization or individual intentionally releasing eagle-owls recently with the intent to establish a breeding population has been found. Many feel that the eagle-owl would be classified as an "alien" species. Due to its predatory abilities, many, especially those in the press, have expressed alarm of their effect on "native" species. From 1994 to 2007, 73 escaped eagle-owls were not registered as returned, while 50 escapees were recaptured. Several recorded breeding attempts have been studied, and most were unsuccessful, due in large part to incidental disturbance by humans and some due to direct persecution, with eggs having been smashed.

=== Effect on conservation-dependent species ===
As highly opportunistic predators, Eurasian eagle-owls hunt almost any appropriately sized prey they encounter. Most often, they take whatever prey is locally common and can take a large number of species considered harmful to human financial interests, such as rats, mice, and pigeons. Eurasian eagle-owls do take rare or endangered species, as well. Among the species considered at least vulnerable (up to critically endangered as in the mink and eel, both heavily overexploited by humans) to extinction known to be hunted by Eurasian eagle-owls are Russian desman (Desmana moschata) Pyrenean desman (Galemys pyrenaicus), barbastelle (Barbastella barbastellus), European ground squirrel (Spermophilus citellus), southwestern water vole (Arvicola sapidus), European mink (Mustela lutreola), marbled polecat (Vormela peregusna), lesser white-fronted goose (Anser erythrops), Egyptian vulture (Neophron percnopterus), greater spotted eagle (Clanga clanga), eastern imperial eagle (Aquila heliaca), saker falcon (Falco cherrug), houbara bustard (Chlamydotis undulata), great bustard (Otis tarda), spur-thighed tortoise (Testudo graeca), Atlantic cod (Gadus morhua), European eel (Anguilla anguilla) and lumpfish (Cyclopterus lumpus).

== See also ==
Flaco, a Eurasian eagle-owl that escaped from the Central Park Zoo in New York City in 2023
