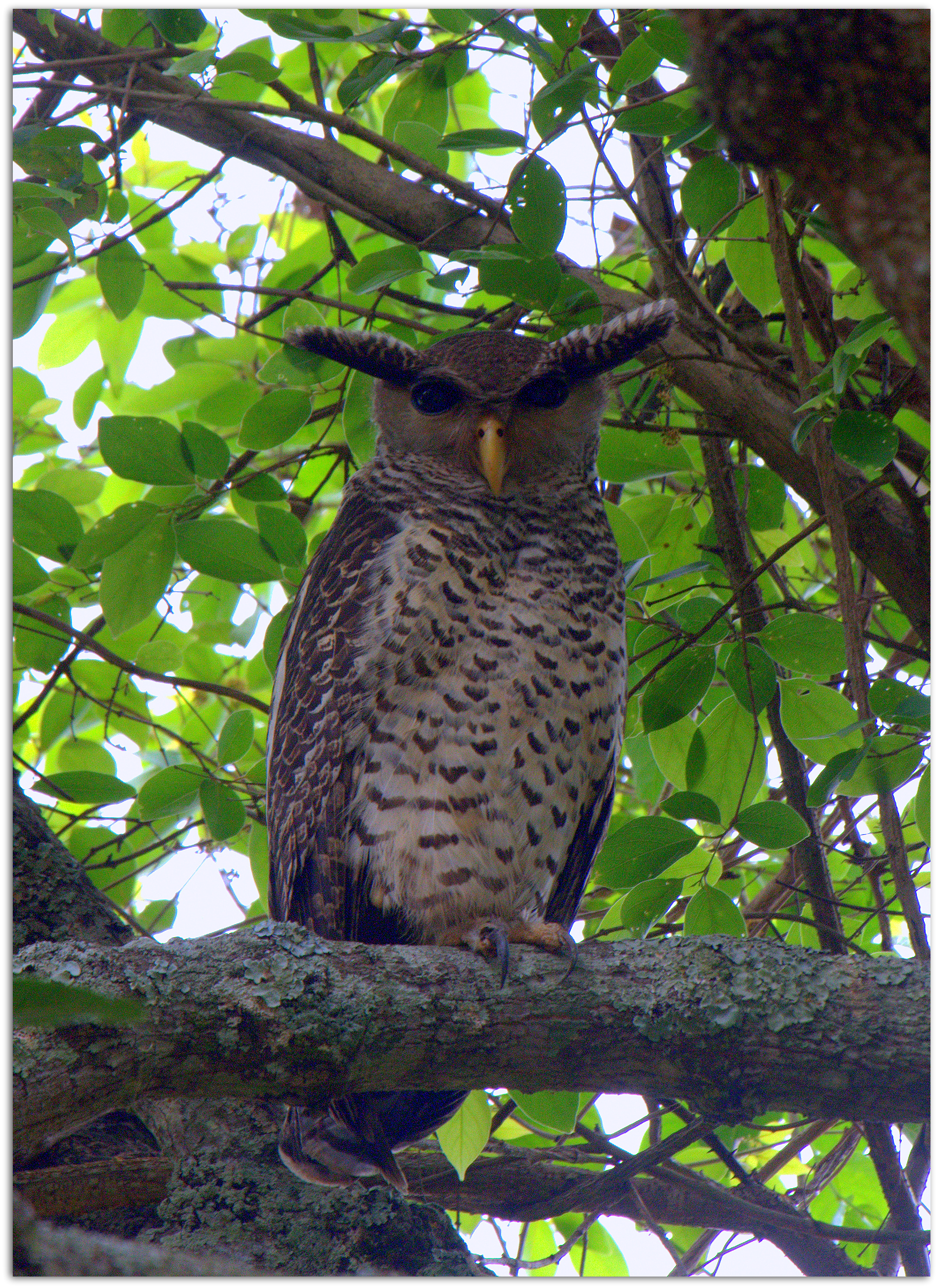

Conservation status
- Least Concern (IUCN 3.1)
- CITES Appendix II

Scientific classification
- Kingdom: Animalia
- Phylum: Chordata
- Class: Aves
- Order: Strigiformes
- Family: Strigidae
- Genus: Ketupa
- Species: K. nipalensis

Binomial name
- Ketupa nipalensis (Hodgson, 1836)

= Spot-bellied eagle-owl =

Species of owl

The spot-bellied eagle-owl (Ketupa nipalensis), also known as the forest eagle-owl, is a large bird of prey with a formidable appearance. It is a forest-inhabiting species found in the Indian subcontinent and Southeast Asia. This species is considered part of a superspecies with the barred eagle-owl (Ketupa sumatrana), which looks quite similar but is allopatric in distribution.

== Taxonomy ==
The spot-bellied eagle-owl, like its close relative, the barred eagle-owl, is one of the species that would have to be moved into Ketupa if that genus is to be retained, according to mtDNA cytochrome b sequence data (Olsen et al. 2002). Unlike the "fish owls" that were also considered to be included in Ketupa, the barred and the spot-bellied species are not closely tied to riparian habitats and piscivorous eating habits. However, all eagle-owls and fish owls (as well as the snowy owl (Bubo scandianus)) were at one point deemed insufficiently distinct to warrant separate genera and until fairly recently authors generally treat all within the genus Bubo. Due to its forest-dwelling habits and some superficial characteristics, it has been wondered by some authors if the spot-bellied eagle-owl is related to the rainforest-dwelling eagle-owls of Africa, namely the Fraser's (Ketupa poensis) and similarly-sized Shelley's eagle-owl (Ketupa shelleyi). However, more extensive genetic research indicates paraphyly with no recent common ancestor between the Ketupa owls and the more "typical" Bubo owls. Therefore the Ketupa owls (including the spot-bellied eagle-owl) are now widely considered as belonging to a distinct genus.

== Description ==
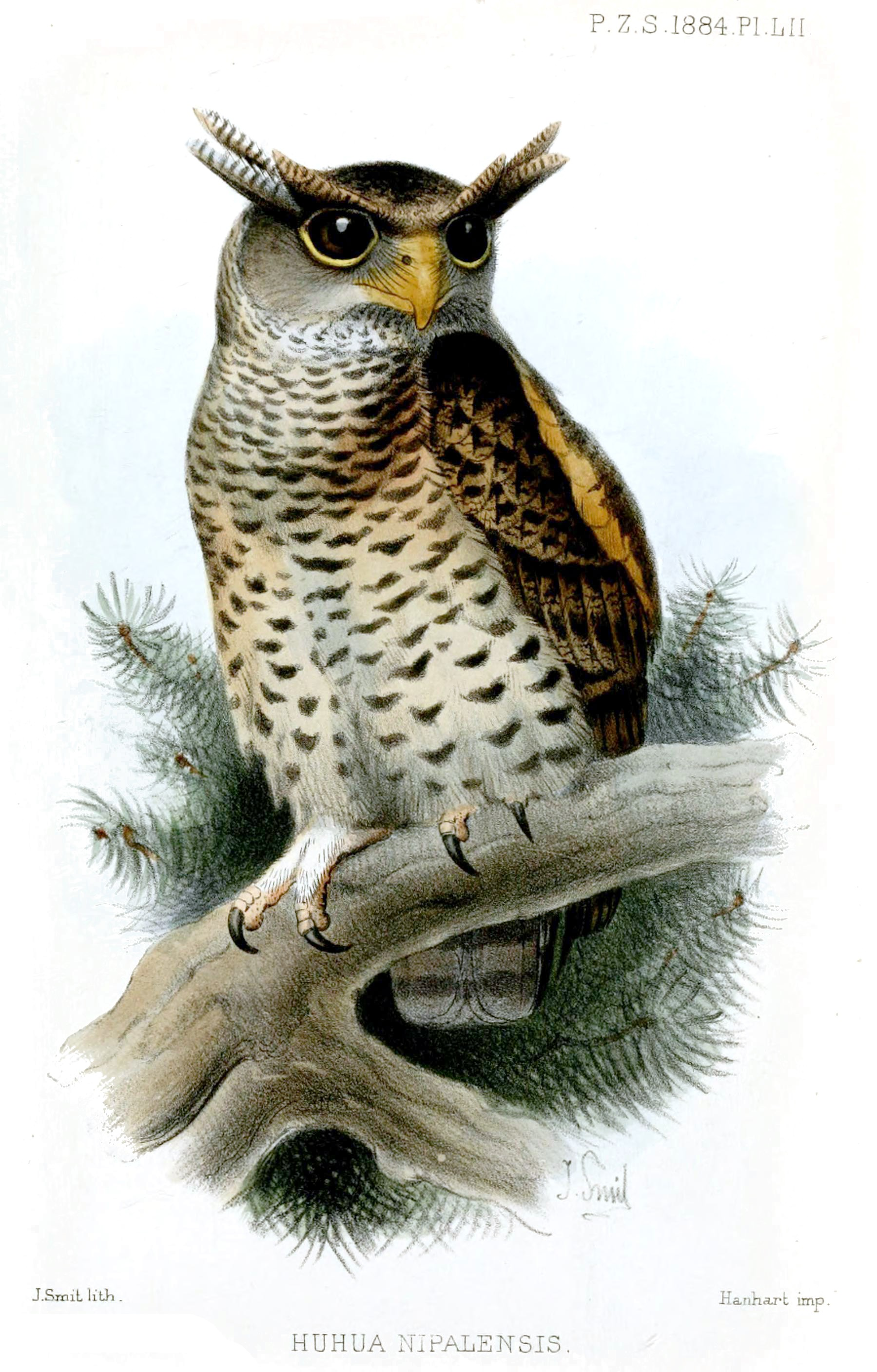
A painting of the spot-bellied eagle-owl.

The spot-bellied eagle-owl is a large species of owl. It measures from 50 to 65 cm (20 to 26 in) in length. It is the sixth longest owl in the world on average and has the ninth longest wings of any living owl. The widely reported weight range for this species is 1.3 to 1.5 kg (2.9 to 3.3 lb), but this is probably towards the low end (possibly from K. n. blighi) or is possibly representative only of smaller males. That body mass range is similar to that of the larger race of barred eagle-owl, which are in all races considerably smaller going on total length, standard measurements and appearance. One female shot near Haputale in the Badulla District of Sri Lanka, where the owls are smaller than to the north, was found to have weighed 1.7 kg (3.7 lb). Perhaps a more correct average weight range for the species is 1.5 to 2.5 kg (3.3 to 5.5 lb). A large owl, presumed as an eagle-owl, recorded on the illegal wildlife trade from India purportedly weighed 3 kg (6.6 lb). The ear-tufts of the spot-bellied are very long and conspicuously of variable length, giving them a somewhat scraggly appearance at the tips. The ear-tufts of the spot-bellied eagle-owl measure 63 to 76 mm (2.5 to 3.0 in) in length. The spot-bellied eagle-owl has feathered legs and feet, like most eagle-owls, but the terminal digits of the toes are bare before the talons. The feet and talons are as formidable as any eagle-owl, being very large, heavy and powerful for their size. This species typically measures 425 to 477 mm (16.7 to 18.8 in) in wing chord length, 230 to 250 mm (9.1 to 9.8 in) in tail length, 60 to 62 mm (2.4 to 2.4 in) in tarsal length and 52 to 54 mm (2.0 to 2.1 in) in culmen length. The subspecies of spot-bellied eagle-owl found on Sri Lanka, K. n. blighi, is linearly about 10% smaller than the birds found further north in India but about the same size as owls from the southern tip of India. K. n. blighi has a wing chord length of 370 to 455 mm (14.6 to 17.9 in), a tail length of 184 to 240 mm (7.2 to 9.4 in), a longer tarsus than northern birds at 63 to 68 mm (2.5 to 2.7 in) and a culmen length of 43 to 48 mm (1.7 to 1.9 in). One bird from Sri Lanka had a middle talon of 44.2 mm (1.7 in), a toe length of 50.6 mm (2.0 in) and a wingspan of 143 cm (56 in). The reported talon length above is very large relative to the size of this owl – the Eurasian eagle-owls found in Spain (Bubo bubo hispanus), although relatively small compared to other Eurasian eagle-owl races, were shown to have smaller talon lengths than the Sri Lankan spot-bellied eagle-owl. Other than size, the only feature that distinguishes northern birds from Sri Lankan birds is an ill-defined band of honey-brown colour on the pectorals.

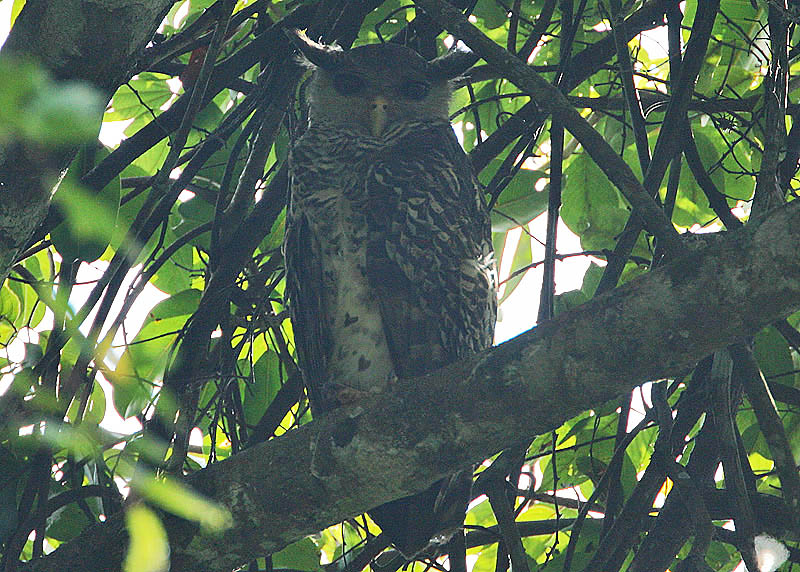
A spot-bellied eagle-owl in Sri Lanka, which are similar to mainland birds but smaller.

The spot-bellied eagle-owl is overall a stark, grayish-brown bird, with dark, coarse brown coloration over the back and upper wings. The throat and underparts are mainly pale fulvous in color with black and white horizontal stripes along the flanks of the body that become broad spots on the abdomen and undertail coverts. On the wings, the primaries are dark brown with lighter brown stripes and the secondaries are more heavily barred with buff-brown coloration. The lores are covered in bristly feathers and the cheeks are brownish-white with black feather shafts. The large ear-tufts slant off to the sides. Juveniles birds are distinct from adult birds, being a much paler grayish-cream overall with fairly heavy brownish barring. Distinguishing the spot-bellied eagle-owl is relatively straightforward, since other Indian and southeast Asian eagle owls do not generally dwell in deep forests as does this species. The spot-bellied is the largest of the owls in its range other than the tawny fish owl (Ketupa flavipes), which is restricted in both habitat and diet to mountain streams. The brown fish owl (Ketupa zeylonensis), which is quite different in colouring if seen reasonably well, is slightly smaller linearly than the spot-bellied eagle-owl and is found in more wetland-based (and often somewhat more degraded) habitats. The subspecies of Eurasian eagle-owl (Bubo bubo hemachalana) found in the Himalayas may inhabit higher elevations of the same mountains where the spot-bellied eagle-owl dwells in the lower elevations in the forested foothills but there their ranges barely abut. The Indian eagle-owl (Bubo bengalensis) (typically found in wooded vicinities of rocky areas) is around 10% smaller than the spot-bellied; the dusky eagle-owl (Ketupa coromanda) (typically found in woods near wetlands) is around 15% smaller; and the brown wood owl, the largest Strix widely found in the Indian subcontinent and Southeast Asia, is around 35% smaller. Furthermore, the colouring and markings of the spot-bellied eagle-owl are distinctive from all but the barred eagle-owl, which it does not co-exist with in the wild. The barred and spot-bellied eagle-owls are immediately distinguished in the field from other eagle-owls by their pale-looking, sideways slanting ear-tufts, and the degree of feathering on the legs and feet. This species pair unlike sympatric eagle-owls has horizontal rather than vertical underside markings (which coalesce somewhat in the barred eagle-owl to barring, but appear as almost continuous spotting on the spot-bellied eagle-owl) over a much paler ground colour, while the back is slightly grayer looking, lacking any warmer brown or tawny tones.

=== Voice ===
This owl is noted for its strange, human-sounding call, and it has been suggested that it is the same as the cryptid known as ulama or "Devil Bird" in Sri Lanka. A local name is Maha Bakamuna ("large horned owl"). According to http://www.cryptozoology.com, in July 2001 it was confirmed that ulama description perfectly matches spot-bellied eagle-owl. This call consists of a scream, which rises and then falls in tone. The territorial call of the species consists of low hoots with two-second intervals between hoos. The voice is booming, deep and carries quite far. It is usual for forest-dwelling owls (and many different kinds of birds) to have an extensive and complex range of vocalizations since vision is more limited than in open or semi-open habitats. However, the spot-bellied eagle-owl has relatively small ear openings, even for a member of the genus Bubo, suggesting that some territorial behaviour is carried out visually instead of auditorily.

== Distribution and habitat ==
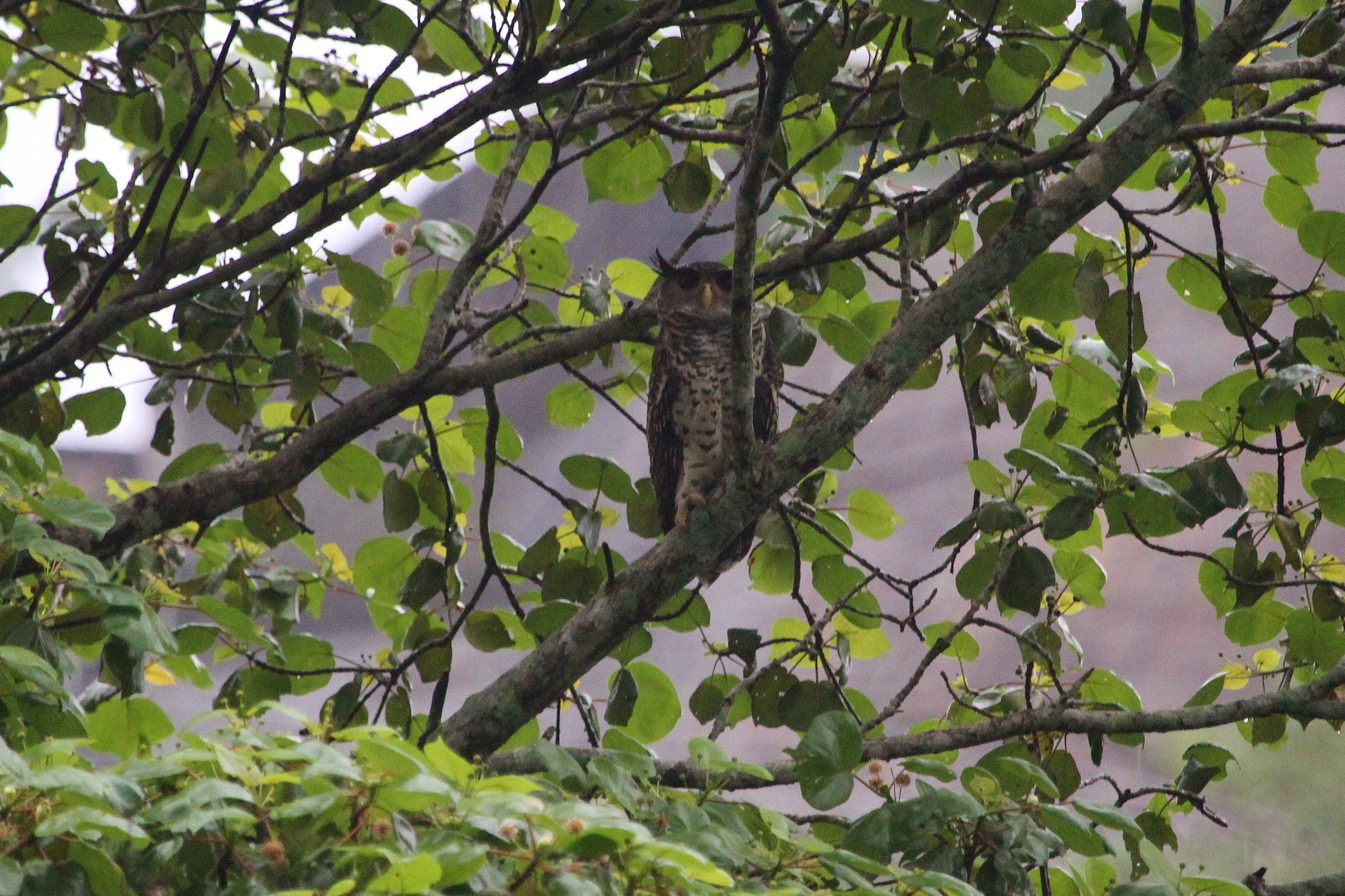
An adult Spot-bellied Eagle-Owl seen right after heavy rains in Sigiriya, Sri Lanka.

This species is distributed through the Lower Himalayas from Kumaon east to Burma, thence to central Laos and central Vietnam. They are found throughout the Indian subcontinent and peninsular Southeast Asia, reaching the southernmost limits of their range in Sri Lanka and 12 degrees north in southern Thailand. The spot-bellied eagle-owl dwells mainly in primary or older second growth forests. Potentially, they can come to inhabit nearly all varieties of land-based habitats but prefer those such as dense, evergreen forests or moist deciduous forests within their range, though they do extend into tropical valleys, terrai and shola in the lower hills of India. Although often considered uncommon to somewhat rare, recent photographic evidence indicates that they are widely found in different parts of India and may simply avoid detection, so long as appropriate wooded habitat remains. They are found in a range of climates from the temperate woodlands of Nepal to the humid, tropical rainforest of Southeast Asia. However. the spot-bellied eagle-owl is mainly a species of tropical and subtropical foothills, mostly distributed at elevations of 900–1,200 m (3,000–3,900 ft), but it can be found from sea-level to 6,300 m (20,700 ft), the latter in the Transhimalayas.

== Behaviour ==
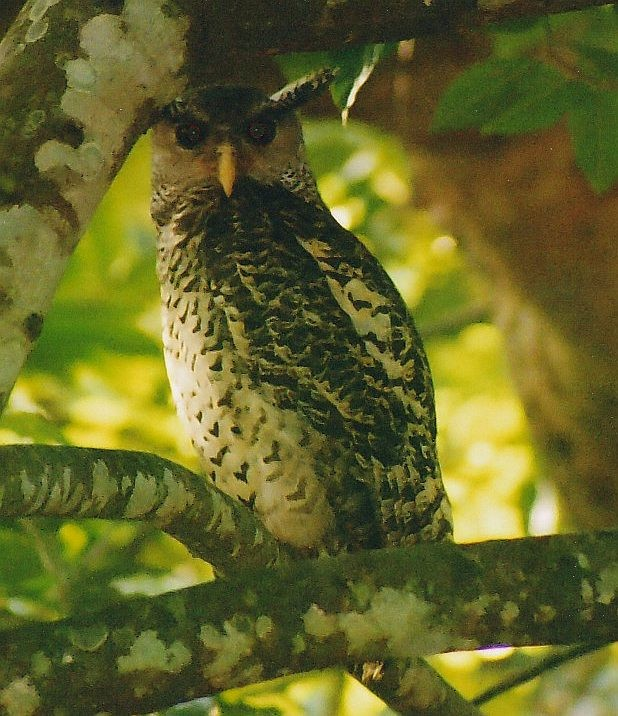
A spot-bellied eagle-owl in the Biligiriranga Hills of south India.

The spot-bellied eagle-owl is nocturnal and often spends its day hidden in the dense foliage of large forest trees. However, they have been observed on the move and even hunting during the day, especially in forests with minimal human disturbance. Their activity normally picks up at dusk as they begin to hunt. In larger forest owls, a partially diurnal behaviour is not uncommon. The bright whitish colouration, overlaid with brownish cross-bars, forming a brow over the eyes to the front of the ear-tufts is theorised to play a primary role in expression of behavioural intent.

=== Diet ===
This is a very powerful and bold predatory owl, which is assuredly at the top of the avian food chain in its forested range. However, no extensive study of its dietary habits is known. Even in larger eagle-owls such as the Eurasian eagle-owl, although they can and do prey on a wide range of prey including impressively large prey, most of the diet consists of small mammals, often small rodents such as voles and rats. There is no reason to assume that the spot-bellied eagle-owl does not also take a very large quantity of relatively small prey such as rodents until complete dietary studies are known. However, almost all of the prey thus far reported for this species is very large and impressive, much of it being presumably as heavy or heavier than the eagle-owls themselves. Due to being most widely reported as being chased and eaten by spot-bellied eagle-owls has led some authors to list their primary prey as pheasants. Among these, junglefowl (Gallus sp.) and kalij pheasants (Lophura leucomelanos), both weighing from 500 to 1,500 g (1.1 to 3.3 lb), are commonly eaten, as well as Indian peafowl (Pavo cristatus), which can weigh anything from 2.75 to 6 kg (6.1 to 13.2 lb). The spot-bellied eagle-owl pounces on gamebirds while they're asleep on their perches in trees or bamboo clumps, often killing them in seconds with their powerful talons. Cases, where they've followed peafowl to their roosts and then pulled them out at sundown, have been reported. It also consumes an array of mammals, from small rodents to large prey such as apparent adults of golden jackals (Canis aureus), hares (Lepus ssp.), large Indian civets (Viverra zibetha), Indian spotted chevrotains (Moschiola indica), and even young muntjacs (Muntiacus sp.). These larger mammals are likely as much as 2 to 9 kg (4.4 to 19.8 lb) or even more. While most reported prey appear to be largely terrestrial, they are known to capture arboreal prey including Indian giant squirrel (Ratufa indica) and juvenile purple-faced langur (Trachypithecus vetulus). Additionally, they are considered a potential threat to toque monkeys (Macaca sinica), and one apparently caught an Indian flying fox (Pteropus giganteus) from its tree roost. Due to the capture of diurnal prey such as giant squirrel, partial daytime foraging habits have been inferred for the spot-bellied eagle owl. They will also opportunistically prey upon snakes, lizards (including large monitor lizards) and fish. Like several of the eagle-owls and fish owls but unlike most owls, the spot-bellied eagle-owl has been recorded as feeding on carrion. Thus far, they've been seen feeding on the carcases of goats (Capra aegagrus hircus) and tigers (Panthera tigris).

=== Breeding ===
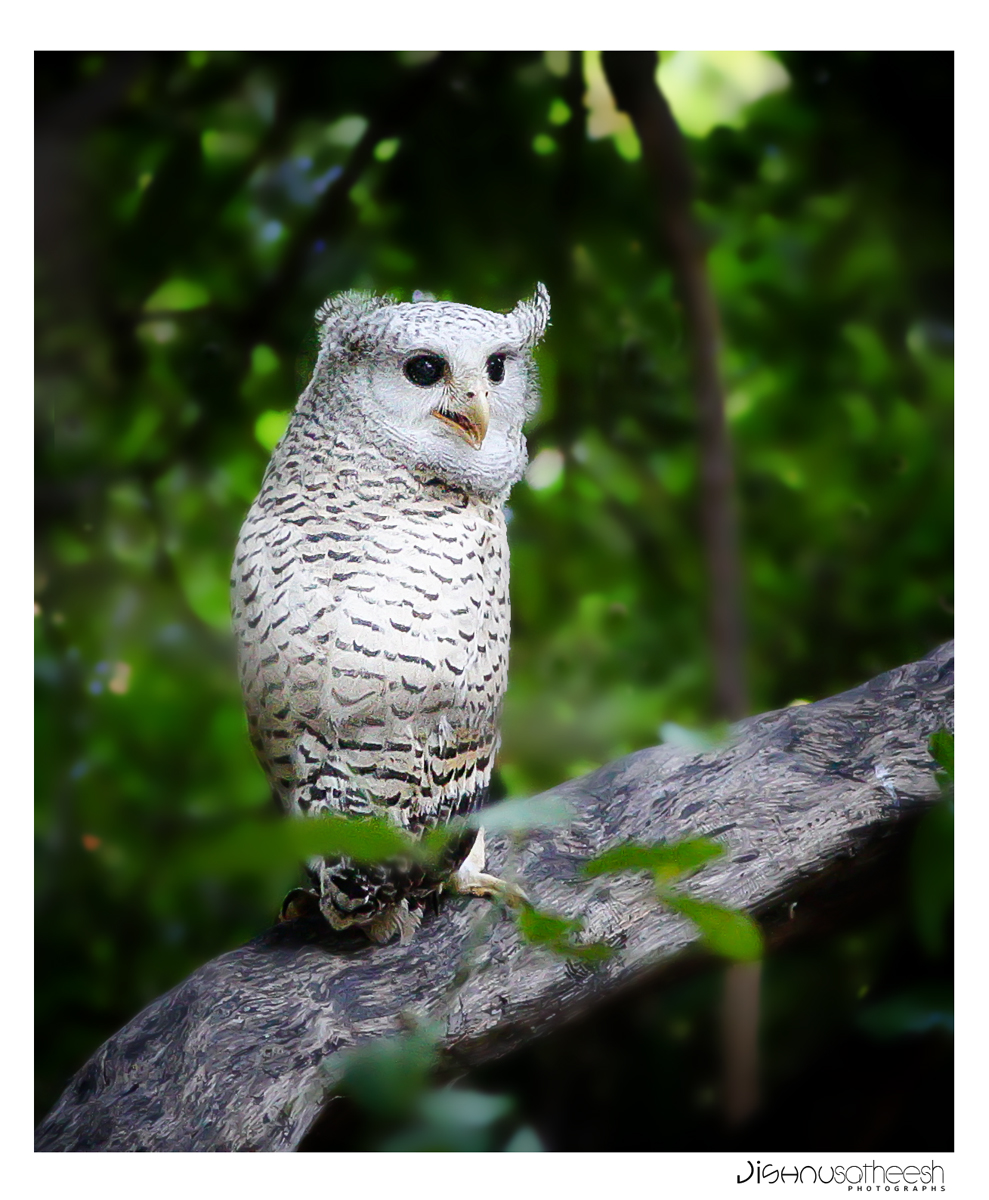
A young spot-bellied eagle-owl, which tend to be paler than adults.

This species' nesting season is from December to March, however, an egg has been recorded as late as June in Cachar. Most nesting sites are in large, spacious tree hollows. Alternately, they use abandoned stick nests made by other large birds, in many cases those previously built by eagles, vultures or kites. They've additionally been recorded as nesting in caves and sheltered fissures of rock walls. In this species, only one egg has ever been recorded per clutch and this is only one of three amongst all owl species (besides the buffy fish owl (Ketupa ketupu) and the barred eagle-owl) where this is known to be the case. The egg is white and round ovoid in shape with a smooth surface, averaging 61.2 mm × 49.9 mm (2.4 in × 2.0 in) in size, and are thus around the same size as the eggs of the largest living owls, the Eurasian eagle-owl and Blakiston's fish owl (Ketupa blakistoni). It has been reported that both sexes engage in incubation but this may not be the case (male owls generally do little to no incubating in eagle-owls), with the male more likely temporarily covering the eggs while the female flies off for a short period. Few further details are known of their breeding biology, including the brooding and fledging stages due to this species reportedly being very fierce and aggressive in defence of their nests. Anecdotes have claimed that some rather serious injuries have been incurred in the process of approaching spot-bellied eagle-owl nests, thus caution and distance from active nests is recommended.

== Status ==
This species is generally uncommon, likely needing large hunting and breeding territories and thus occurs at low densities. However, it continues to occur over a large range and is not thought to be conservation dependent. Areas where deforestation occurs are likely to be vacated by this species, which is perhaps the only widespread threat faced by this owl. Despite its unknown and probably declining population size, the spot-bellied eagle-owl is evaluated as least concern on the IUCN Red List.
