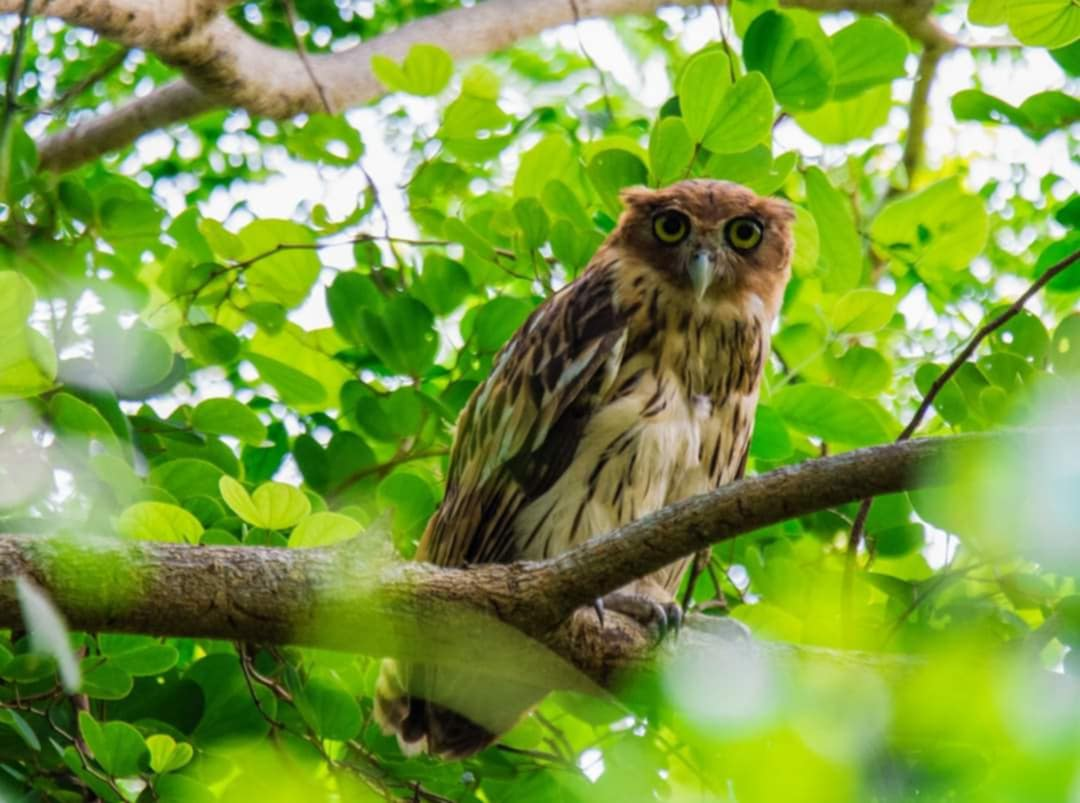
- Wild individual at La Mesa Ecopark

Conservation status
- Vulnerable (IUCN 3.1)
- CITES Appendix II

Scientific classification
- Kingdom: Animalia
- Phylum: Chordata
- Class: Aves
- Order: Strigiformes
- Family: Strigidae
- Genus: Ketupa
- Species: K. philippensis

Binomial name
- Ketupa philippensis (Kaup, 1851)

= Philippine eagle-owl =

Species of owl

The Philippine eagle-owl (Ketupa philippensis) is a vulnerable species of owl belonging to the family Strigidae. It is endemic to the Philippines, where it is found in lowland forests on the islands of Catanduanes, Samar, Bohol, Mindanao, Luzon, Leyte and possibly Sibuyan. While it is the largest owl in the Philippines, it is relatively small compared to other members of its genus. It is a vulnerable species with its population on the decline. Its main threats are habitat destruction, hunting and poaching for the pet trade.

== Description ==
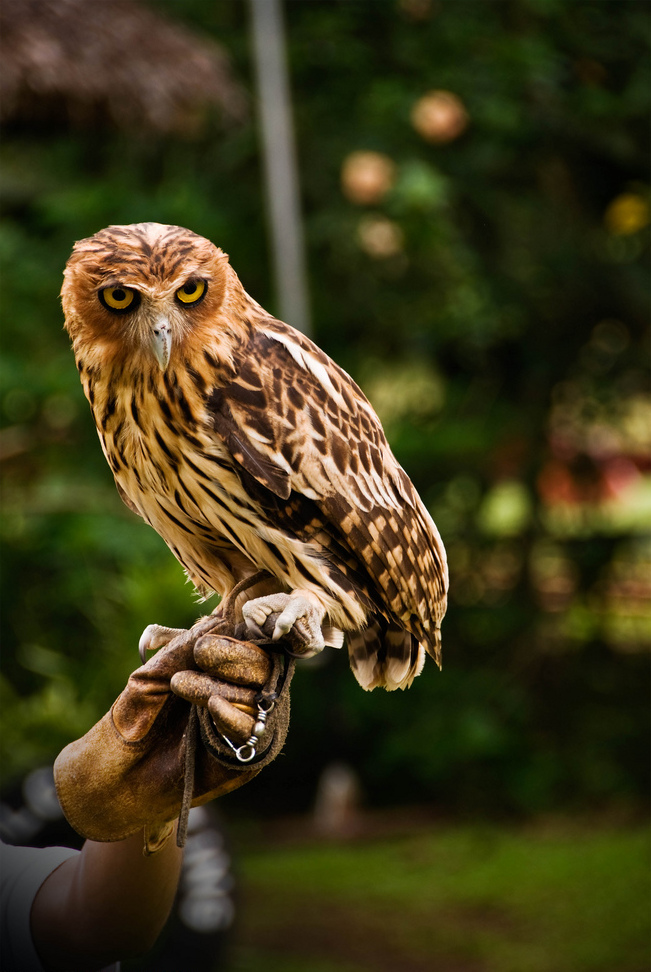
At Malagos Garden Resort, Davao City, Philippines

The Philippine eagle-owl has a total wingspan of about 48 inches, and with a total length of 40–50 cm (15.5–19.5 in) and a wing-length of about 35 cm (14 in), (where typically a female would size larger than a male) it is the largest owl in the Philippines, but among the smallest members of the genus Ketupa. It is overall rufous with a lighter belly and yellow eyes. It has a warm brown coloring with many markings on its back, with a bird call pitch of a long whistle that rises shortly and falls at the end. It is also described as being incredibly bulky and having tufted ears, closely resembling the buffy fish-owl (Ketupa ketupu). The subspecies K. p. mindanensis is darker and more heavily streaked than the nominate form.

== Taxonomy ==
The Philippine eagle-owl was formally described in 1851 by the German naturalist Johann Jakob Kaup. He placed the owl in his new genus Pseudoptynx and coined the binomial name Pseudoptynx philippensi. The Philippine eagle-owl is now placed in the genus Ketupa that was introduced in 1831 by the French naturalist René Lesson.

Two subspecies are recognised:

- K. p. philippensis (Kaup, 1851) – Luzon and Catanduanes (northern Philippines)
- K. p. mindanensis (Ogilvie-Grant, 1906) – Mindanao, Leyte, Samar and Bohol (southern Philippines); ;larger and darker than the nominate

== Habitat ==
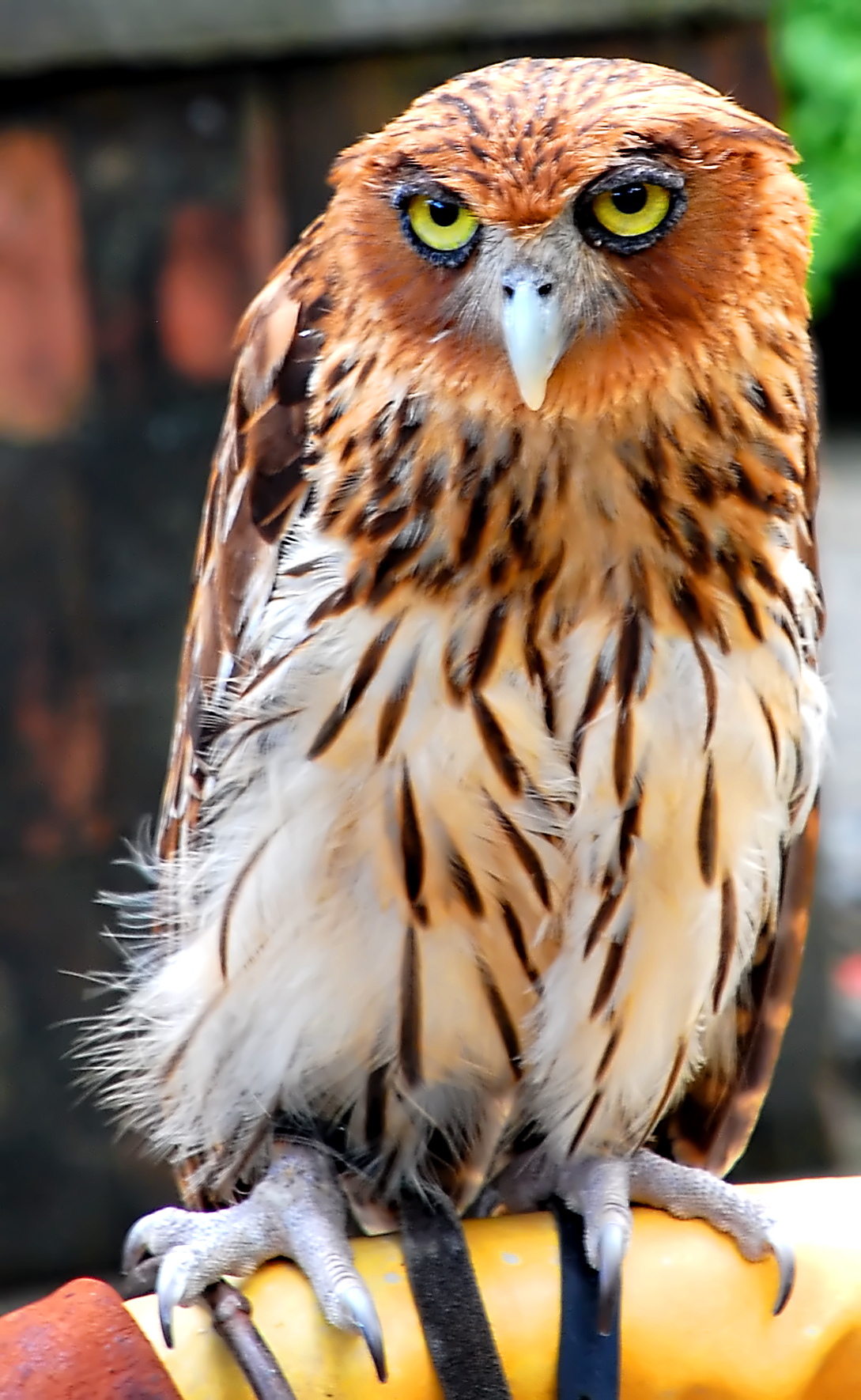
At captive bird in Avilon Zoo, Rodriguez, Rizal, Philippines

This owl inhabits forest edges near streams. They rest in a tree during the day and hunt at dusk to feed on small vertebrates. The Philippine eagle-owl is the largest owl in the country.

== Behavior ==
Little is known about the behavior of this secretive species, but the powerful feet suggest it feeds on small mammals and birds.

This eagle-owl lays one egg per clutch and has an incubation period of 35 days.

=== Breeding in captivity ===
In December 2005, Negros Forests and Ecological Foundation (NFEFI) in Bacolod was the first conservation center in the world to successfully hatch a Philippine eagle-owl (aptly nicknamed Bubo) in captivity and it has the only breeding pair of these owls in captivity anywhere in the world.

On November 21, 2005, conservationists at the center made world history when it successfully bred a Philippine eagle-owl in captivity. Notably NFEFI had first secured the first-ever captive breeding loan between DENR-accredited institutions in the Philippines, consisting of three pairs of eagle-owls from the Avilon Montalban Zoological Park in Montalban, Rizal and transported them to Bacolod in December 2002. Two pairs showed attraction, and the couple Hinahon and Suplada—local terms for "calm" and "snob"—made courtship. It was on November 21, 2005, that an owlet was discovered in the nest, about three days old, and named Bubo. As Bubo grew, Suplada taught it how to tear pieces of mouse meat, thus rearing it.

In 2006, Suplada also laid one egg and another owlet was hatched through the aid of the World Owl Trust, Flora and Fauna International-Philippine Biodiversity Conservation program and the Avilon Zoological Park in Montalban Rizal. The Philippine eagle-owl is also protected in areas through the Conservation of Priority Protected Areas Project (CPPAP) in Luzon, Mts Kitanglad and Apo on MIndanao.

Hunting of the Philippine eagle-owl is illegal in the Philippines, but lacks proper enforcement because many local people are able to resist strict control attempts.

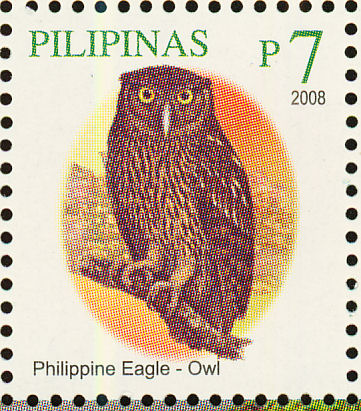
Depicted on a Philippine stamp from 2008

=== Early life ===
After hatching, Philippine eagle-owl chicks need to be intensely cared for by their parents. These new chicks are unable to thermoregulate by themselves, so they need the body heat from their mother or father to keep them warm. These chicks are also unable to feed themselves due to their lack of ability to fly. The father bird will go out to catch the food while the mother will tear it up into smaller pieces for the chick to eat.

== Conservation status ==
This species has been assessed as a vulnerable species by the International Union for Conservation of Nature. Its population is estimated at 2,500 to 10,000 mature adults and is declining. Its main threats are habitat loss from illegal logging, land conversion, mining. This species is also persecuted as owls are supposedly bad luck. It has also been recorded being traded in illegal wildlife trade groups.

Most recent records of this bird are in Luzon; there is only one unexpected record in Bohol in 1994 and Mindanao records are extremely sparse.

This species has been recorded in the protected areas Northern Sierra Madre Natural Park, La Mesa Ecopark and Bataan National Park, however most sightings are recorded outside protected areas.

It is recommended that further fieldwork be conducted to better understand its distribution and status; improve the protection in existing protected areas and better develop the captive breeding population.
