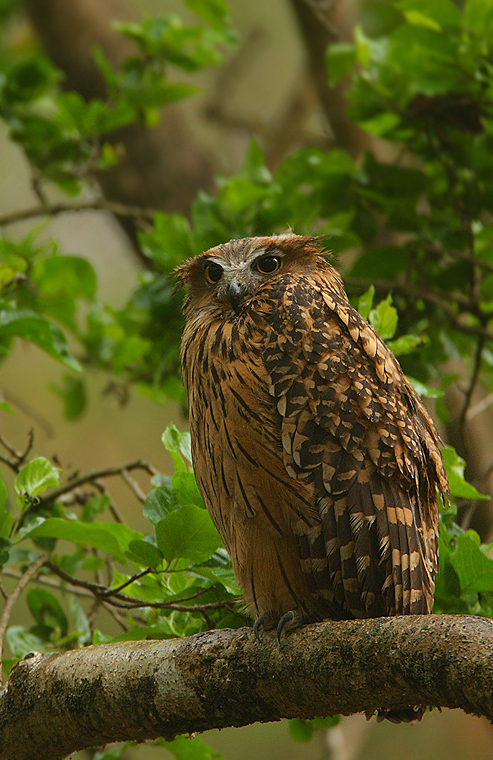

Conservation status
- Least Concern (IUCN 3.1)
- CITES Appendix II

Scientific classification
- Kingdom: Animalia
- Phylum: Chordata
- Class: Aves
- Order: Strigiformes
- Family: Strigidae
- Genus: Ketupa
- Species: K. flavipes

Binomial name
- Ketupa flavipes (Hodgson, 1836)

Synonyms
- Cultrunguis flavipes Hodgson, 1836

= Tawny fish owl =

Species of owl

The tawny fish owl (Ketupa flavipes) is a fish owl species in the family known as typical owls, Strigidae. It is native from southern Nepal to Bangladesh, Vietnam and China and Bhutan. Due to its wide geographical distribution, it is listed as Least Concern on the IUCN Red List.

== Taxonomy ==
Cultrunguis flavipes was the scientific name proposed by Brian Houghton Hodgson in 1836 who described a yellow-footed fish owl from Nepal. Ketupa was proposed as generic name by René-Primevère Lesson in 1831 for fish owl species from Java and India. Results of a phylogenetic analysis of nine horned owl species indicate that Ketupa species form a monophyletic group.

== Description ==
Like other fish owls, the tawny fish owl has large ear tufts but they usually hang to the sides of the head and are distinctly messy and tousled looking. They have yellow eyes. Tawny fish owls have been described as the most "attractive" of the fish owls. They tend to be an orangey-rufous color on the crown and upperparts, which are overlaid with broad, blackish markings on the central part of the feathers and spots of the same color as the reddish-brown feather edges. The scapulars are a dingy yellow color, forming a contrasting band which runs across the owl's shoulders. The flight and tail feathers are strongly barred dark brown and buffish. The facial disc is poorly defined but a sizeable off-white area on the eyebrows and forehead stands out. While buffy and brown fish owls are featherless on their legs and the Blakiston's fish owl (Ketupa blakistoni) has totally feathered legs (the latter more like most Bubo), the tawny fish owl has feathering over two-thirds of the tarsi. The legs below feathering are greenish-yellow with greyish-horn coloured talons. Beside the variability of the feathering of the legs, the buffy fish owl is most similar in plumage but is smaller and buff hued rather than orange-rufous hued. The brown fish owl is a much more solid brown color with distinct vermiculations below and no yellowish band across the back.

Compared to eagle owls of similar length, fish owls tend to be even shorter in tail length and even heavier in build, have relatively larger wings (the tawny and Blakiston's being particularly chunky in shape), have considerably longer legs, and have a rough texture to the bottom of their toes. At least the latter two features are clear adaptations to aid these owls in capturing fish. Diurnal raptors who feed largely on fish have similar, if not identical, rough texture under their toes, which helps these birds grasp slippery fish. Unlike diurnal raptors who capture fish such as the osprey (Pandion haliaetus) as compared to most terrestrial raptors, the fish owls have large, powerful, and curved talons and a longitudinal sharp keel sitting under the middle claw with all having sharp cutting edges that are very much like those of eagle owls. Also, unlike many fish-eating diurnal raptors, fish owl will not submerge any part of their body while hunting, preferring only to put their feet into the water, although fish owls will hunt on foot, wading into the shallows. Unlike most owls, the feathers of fish owls are not soft to the touch and they lack the comb and hair-like fringes to the primaries, which allow other owls to fly silently in order to ambush their prey. Due to the lack of these feather-specializations, fish owl wing beats make sounds. The lack of a deep facial disc in fish owls is another indication of the unimportance of sound relative to vision in these owls, as facial disc depth (as well as inner ear size) are directly related to how important sound is to an owl's hunting behavior. Similar adaptations, such as unwillingness to submerge beyond their legs and lack of sound-muffling feathers are also seen in the African fishing owls, which do not seem to be directly related. Tawny fish owls are around the same size as the brown fish owl in terms of linear dimensions. The tawny is 48 to 61 cm (19 to 24 in) long from bill to tail. However, studies have revealed the tawny is surprisingly rather heavier on average than the brown fish owl and, less surprising, is considerably heavier than an eagle owl of comparable length. Six adult tawny fish owls were found to weigh an average of 2,415 g (5.324 lb), with a reported range of 2,050 to 2,650 g (4.52 to 5.84 lb), and are thus one of the heaviest living owl species. Only the Blakiston's fish owl and a majority of races of Eurasian eagle owl (B. bubo) are heavier on average. The maximum (not average) weight of Verreaux's eagle owls (Ketupa lactea) and snowy owls (B. scandiacus) are also higher but those species have far larger sample sizes of body mass. In terms of standard measurements, the wing chord is 410 to 477 mm (16.1 to 18.8 in), the tail is 215 to 227 mm (8.5 to 8.9 in), the tarsus is 60 to 67 mm (2.4 to 2.6 in) and the bill is 48 to 52 mm (1.9 to 2.0 in). Compared to the brown fish owl, the tawny averages of similar tail length, is larger in size by average wing length and bill size and slightly smaller in tarsal length.

== Distribution and habitat ==
The tawny fish owl lives in subtropical to temperate forests in southern Nepal, northern India, Bangladesh, Bhutan, China, Laos, Myanmar, Taiwan, and Vietnam. It inhabits the Himalayan foothills from Kashmir and Garhwal east to the mountains in Laos, Vietnam and southern China up to Zhejiang and Anhui. It requires forest tracts with mountain streams. In areas such as Darjeeling and Nepal, it lives at elevations of 1,500 to 2,450 m (4,920 to 8,040 ft). Its range partly overlaps with the one of brown fish owl (K. zeylonensis) in Laos and Vietnam, where it prefers fast flowing waters in remote wilderness with little to no disturbance.

== Behaviour and ecology ==
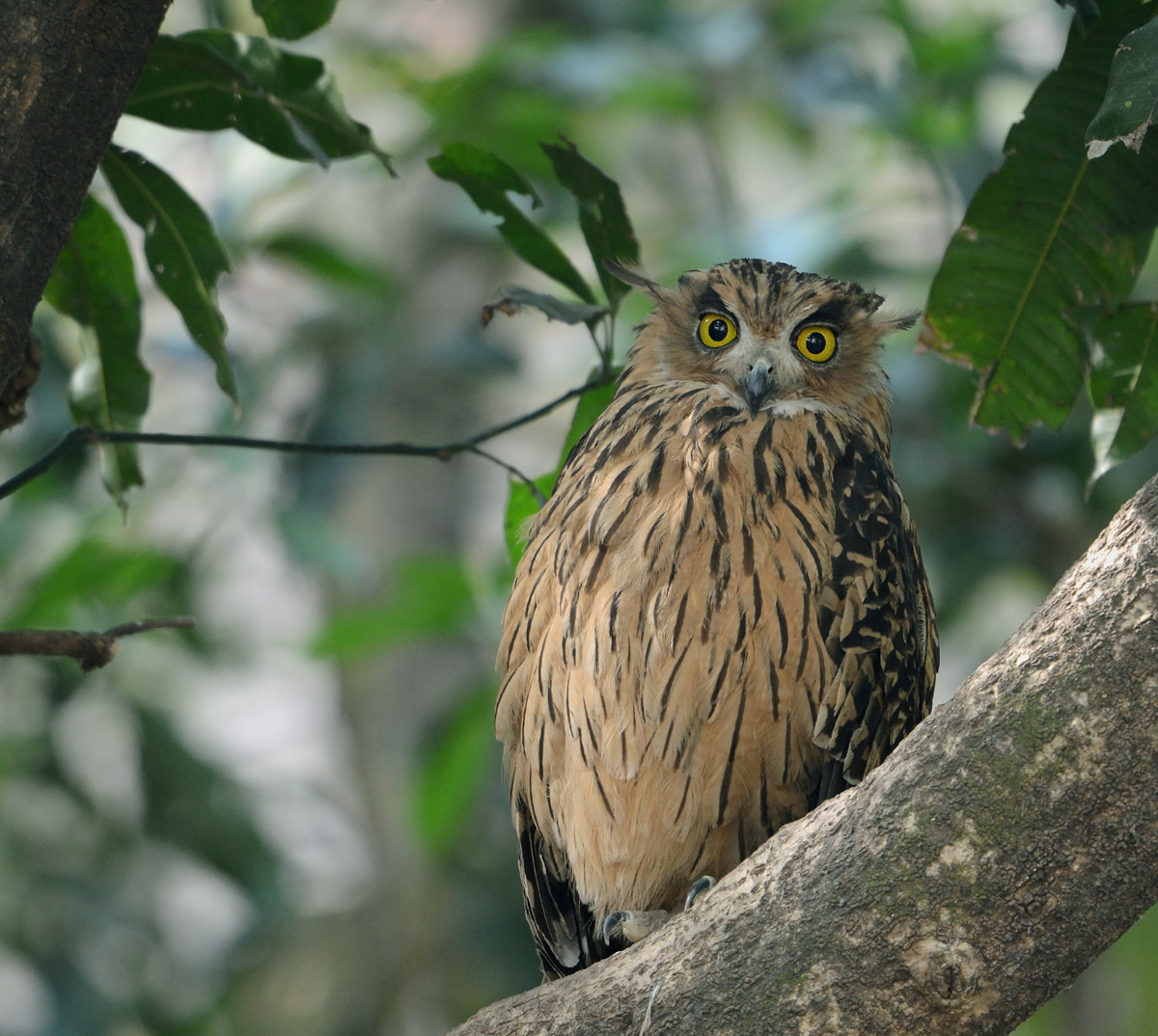
Tawny fish owl in Jim Corbett National Park, Uttarakhand

The tawny fish owl's territorial call is a deep whoo-hoo. It also makes a cat-like meow.

Four tawny fish owls were equipped with radio transmitters in Taiwan and monitored from October 1994 to July 1996. They were mainly nocturnal, left their day-time roosts around sunset and returned before sunrise. They were most active moving and foraging during twilight, and moved up to 1,800 m (5,900 ft) in an hour. They moved more frequently in the cold season. In summer, breeding owls showed some daytime activity, consisting mainly of preening. They also hunted during the day when feeding their fledglings. Each owl used up to 17 different roosting sites that were all located in old-growth forest 20 to 550 m (66 to 1,804 ft) away from a stream. In the cold season, they roosted closer to streams, but also moved to uphill roosting sites in the warmer months. They avoided disturbed habitat like grassland, agricultural land and the vicinity of villages.

The tawny fish owl is at least partially diurnal in activity, with daytime activity mainly occurring in the late afternoon and they may be seen actively hunting before nightfall especially on cloudy days. However, before the afternoon they tend to be sluggish during the day. If disturbed or threatened, these owls tend to sit tight and not take flight. Like most owls, they usually choose inconspicuous perches during the day to avoid detection. The tawny fish owl has been described as the "most powerful and savage" of the three smaller fish owl species. The pellets of tawny fish owls in Taiwan were found on rocks, under perching and daytime roosts. They contained remains of Taiwan mitten crab (Eriocheir formosa), tip-nosed frog (Odorrana swinhoana), brown tree frog (Buergeria robusta), Asiatic toad (Bufo gargarizans), freshwater crabs, shrimps and fish. They took toads considerably more regularly than other frog species, although far less abundant in number in the stream and wetlands, due to their larger sizes.

They usually hunt by swooping down to the water, capture fish from the surface and are reportedly surprisingly active in their hunting style and are not dissimilar in the hunting methods to those used by diurnal fish-hunting raptors such as fish eagles, sea eagles and ospreys. More terrestrial prey is by no means avoided though and the species may also hunt toads, lizards, snakes, and small mammals such as moles, and particularly rodents, with one of the few mammalian prey recorded semi-regularly being bamboo rats (Rhizomys). A small Malayan porcupine (Hystrix brachyura) has also been reported amongst their prey. It also prey on birds including Mandarin ducks (Aix galericulata) in Taiwan and has overtaken large ground birds such junglefowl (Gallus ssp.), pheasants and eared pheasants, the latter sometimes weighing more than 2 kg (4.4 lb). Tawny fish owls tend to be sparsely distributed and frequently live in riparian zones of 5.5–7.7 km (3.4–4.8 mi) in length.

Tawny fish owls are highly solitary and territorial as are a majority of owls. The breeding season is November to February in India and December to February in Assam. Nest locations found have included large holes in river banks, caves in cliffs and the fork or crotch of a large tree. As in all owls, tawny fish owls do not build a nest so merely lay their eggs on the bare ground of whatever surface they use. They also not infrequently nest in abandoned nests built by Pallas's fish eagles (Haliaeetus leucoryphus). Usually two eggs are laid but sometimes only one is. The eggs can range in size from 56 to 58.8 mm (2.20 to 2.31 in) x 45.5 to 48.3 mm (1.79 to 1.90 in), with an average of 57.1 mm × 46.9 mm (2.25 in × 1.85 in), and are similar in size to those of the brown fish owl. Greater details of the reproductive biology are not currently known although are presumed to basically be similar to those of other fish owls.
