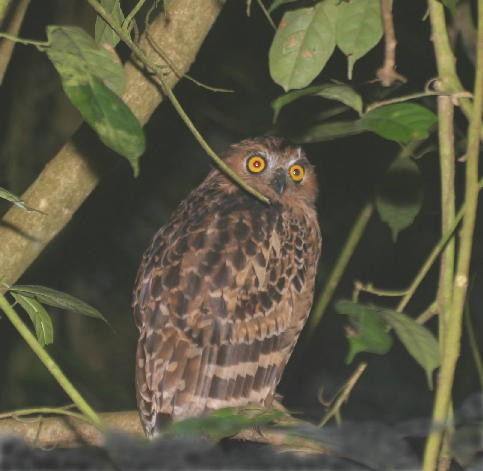
- Buffy fish owl

Scientific classification
- Kingdom: Animalia
- Phylum: Chordata
- Class: Aves
- Order: Strigiformes
- Family: Strigidae
- Genus: Ketupa; Lesson, 1830

Type species
- Ketupa javanensis = Strix ketupa Lesson, 1830

= Ketupa =

Genus of birds

Ketupa is a genus of owls in the family Strigidae. The genus formerly contained just three species, the fish owls, but based on the results from a genetic study published in 2020, the generic boundaries were altered. The genus now contains twelve species, nine of which were formerly placed in the genus Bubo.

== Taxonomy ==
The genus Ketupa was introduced in 1830 by the French naturalist René Lesson for fish owl species from Java and India. The type species is, by tautonymy, the buffy fish owl. The genus name is derived from the Malay word Ketupok for the buffy fish owl.

This genus formerly contained fewer species. A molecular phylogenetic study of the typical owl family (Strigidae) published in 2020 and another study published in 2021 found that the genera Ketupa and Scotopelia were embedded in the genus Bubo, rendering the genus paraphyletic. In a move to create monophyletic genera, nine species were moved from Bubo to Ketupa. Four of these species (shelleyi, coromandus, leucosticta, and philippinensis) had not been sampled in the genetic studies but were assumed to belong to Ketupa based on their morphological similarities to those species that had been sampled. Scotopelia (containing the fishing owls) was retained as a separate genus, although the genetic results suggested that the Scotopelia may be embedded within Ketupa.

The genus now contains thirteen species:

- Fraser's eagle-owl, Ketupa poensis – formerly placed in Bubo
- Akun eagle-owl, Ketupa leucosticta – formerly placed in Bubo
- Verreaux's eagle-owl, Ketupa lactea – formerly placed in Bubo
- Shelley's eagle-owl, Ketupa shelleyi – formerly placed in Bubo
- Blakiston's fish owl, Ketupa blakistoni – formerly placed in Bubo
- Northern fish owl, Ketupa doerriesi – formerly placed in Bubo
- Brown fish owl, Ketupa zeylonensis
- Tawny fish owl, Ketupa flavipes
- Buffy fish owl, Ketupa ketupu
- Barred eagle-owl, Ketupa sumatrana – formerly placed in Bubo
- Spot-bellied eagle-owl, Ketupa nipalensis – formerly placed in Bubo
- Dusky eagle-owl, Ketupa coromanda – formerly placed in Bubo
- Philippine eagle-owl, Ketupa philippensis – formerly placed in Bubo
