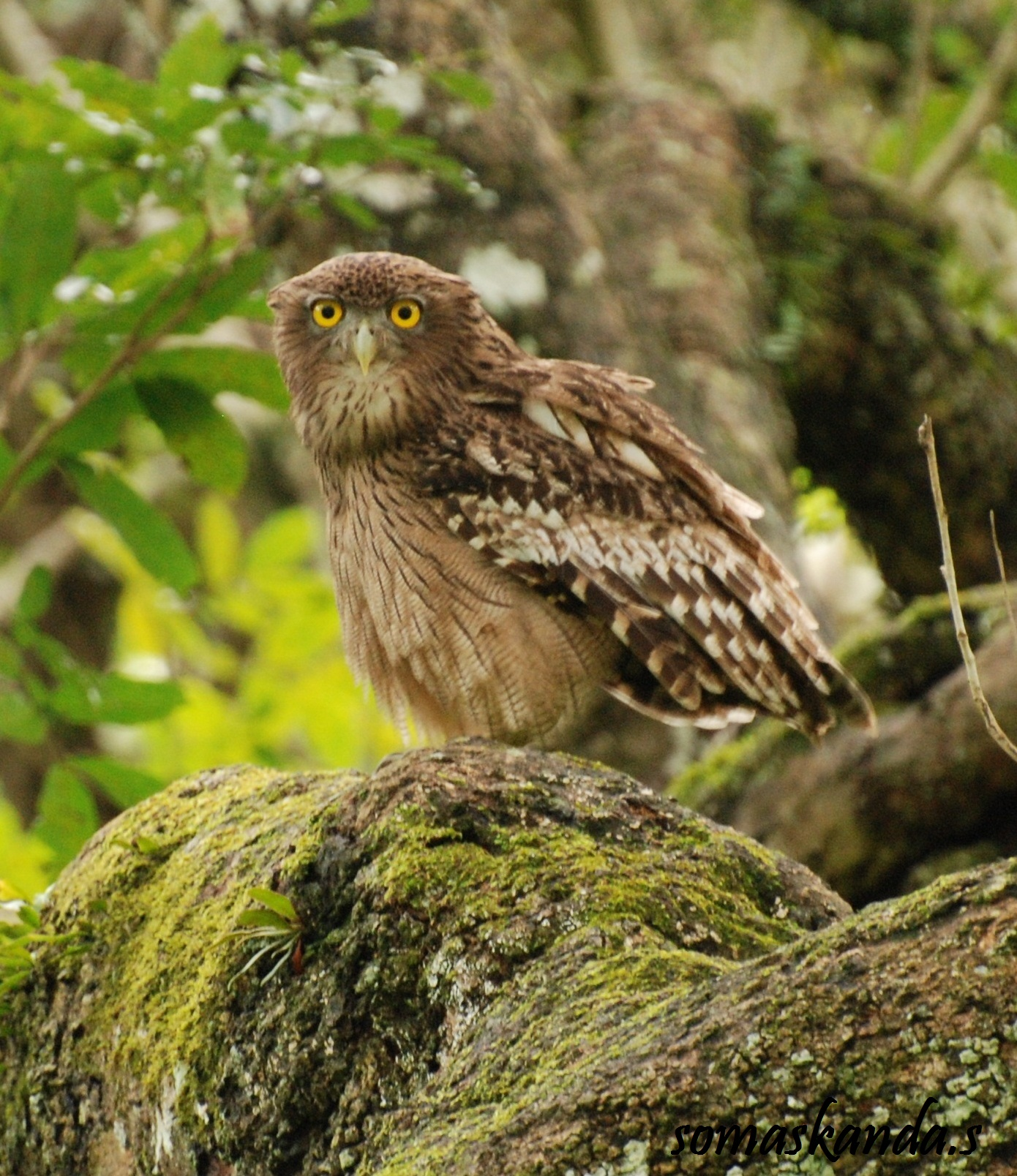
- Brown fish owl in Biligiriranga Hills

Conservation status
- Least Concern (IUCN 3.1)
- CITES Appendix II

Scientific classification
- Kingdom: Animalia
- Phylum: Chordata
- Class: Aves
- Order: Strigiformes
- Family: Strigidae
- Genus: Ketupa
- Species: K. zeylonensis

Binomial name
- Ketupa zeylonensis (Gmelin, JF, 1788)

Subspecies
- See text
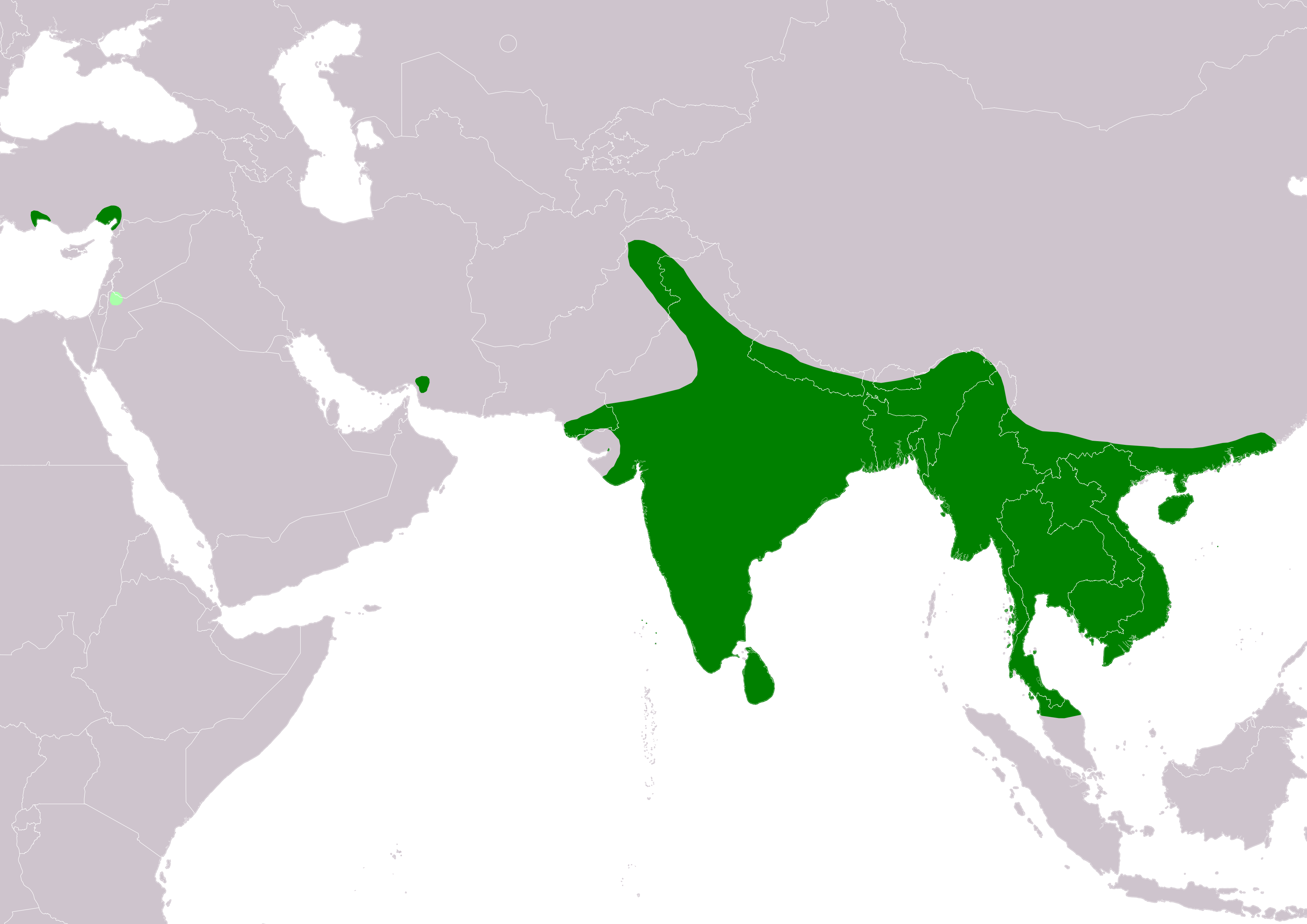
- Range of brown fish owl Resident Possibly Extant (resident)

Synonyms
- Bubo zeylonensis; Strix zeylonensis Gmelin, 1788; and see text

Audio
- Calls (South India)

= Brown fish owl =

Species of owl

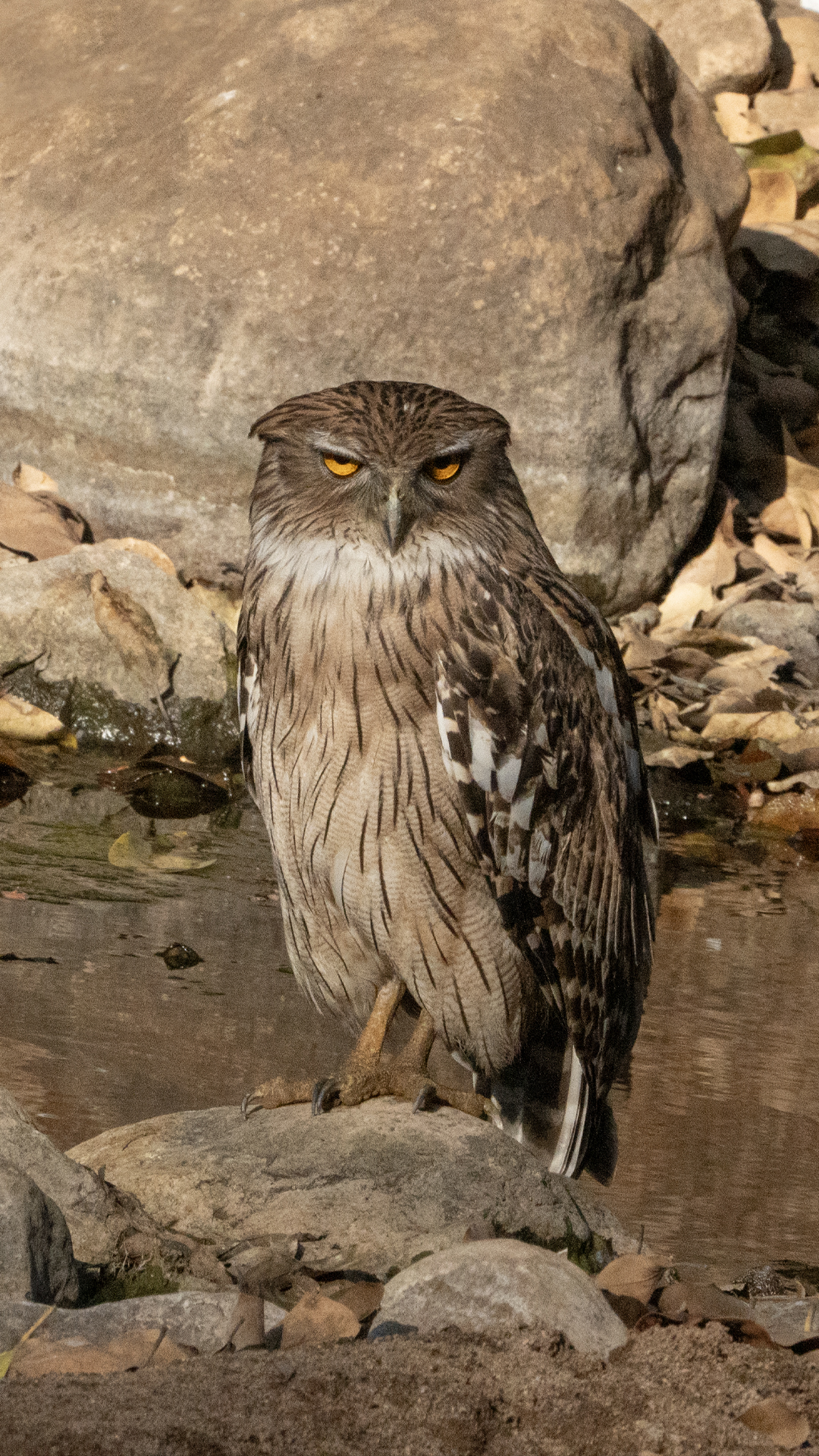
At Ranthambore National Park

The brown fish owl (Ketupa zeylonensis) is a fish owl species in the family known as typical owls, Strigidae. It is native from Turkey to South and Southeast Asia. Due its wide distribution it is listed as Least Concern on the IUCN Red List. It inhabits forests and wooded wetlands. Of the four living species of fish owl, it is the most widely distributed, most common and best-studied. It occupies a range of over 7,000 km (4,300 mi).

== Taxonomy ==
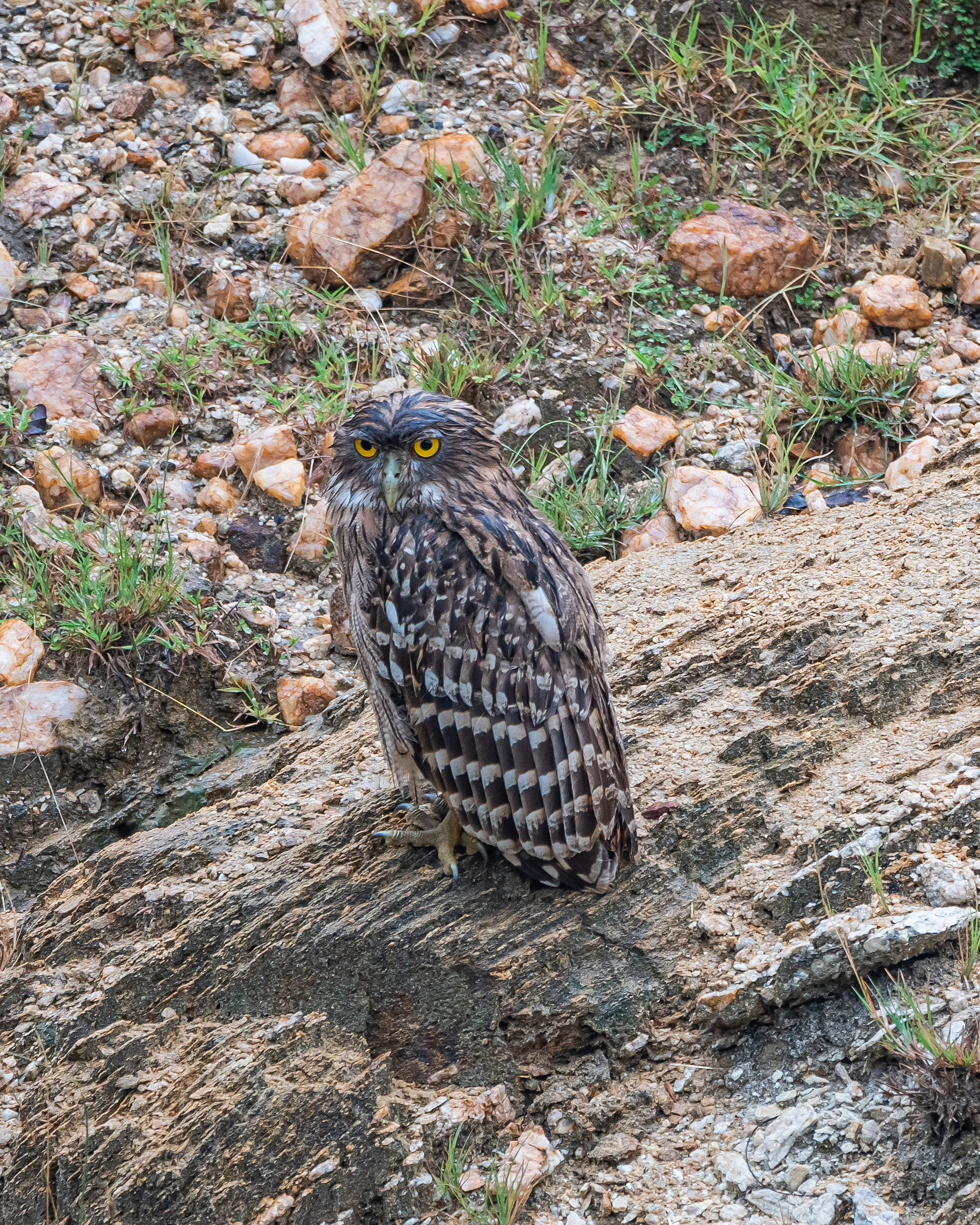
A brown fish owl of the nominate subspecies zeylonensis, which is smaller and darker than other subspecies

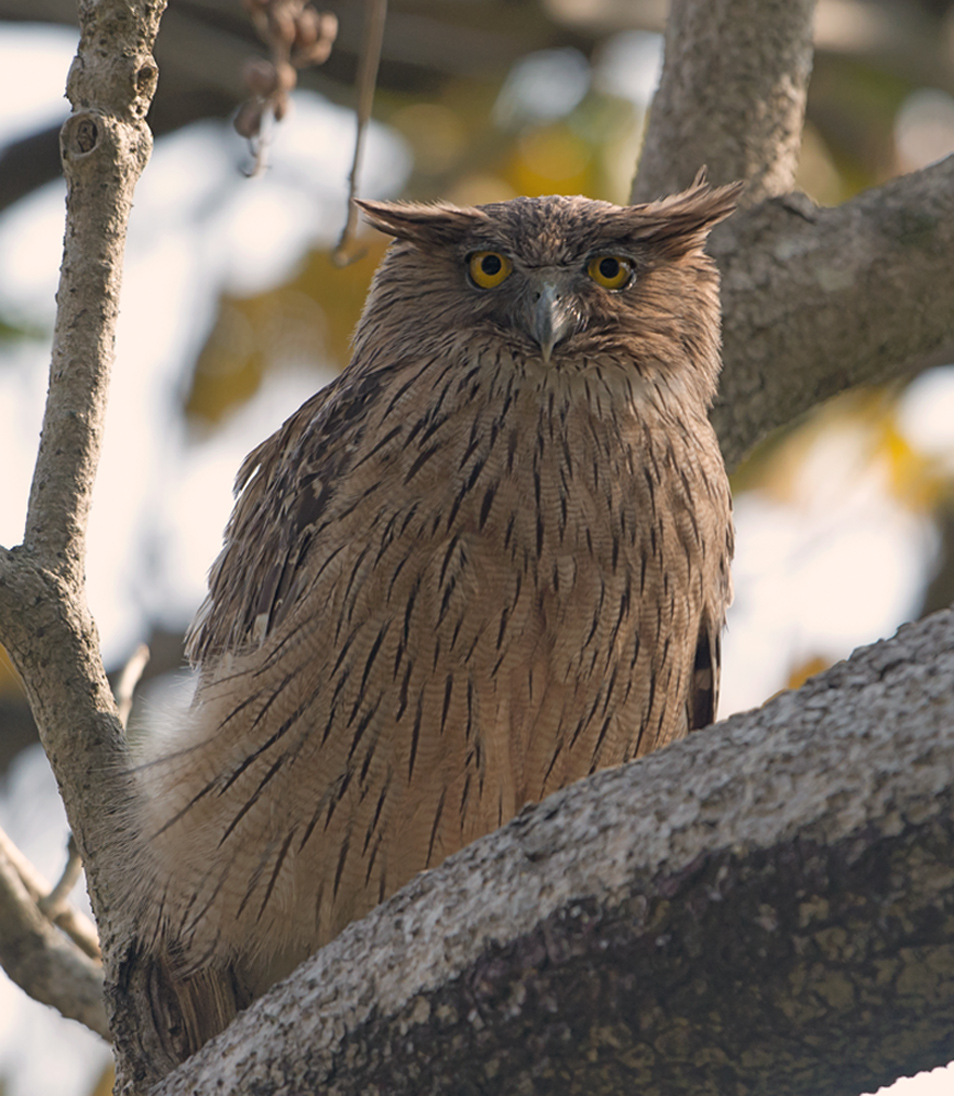
A brown fish owl in India

The brown fish owl was formally described in 1788 by the German naturalist Johann Friedrich Gmelin in his revised and expanded edition of Carl Linnaeus's Systema Naturae. He placed it with the other owls in the genus Strix and coined the binomial name Strix zeylonensis. Gmelin based his description on the "Great Ceylonese horned owl" that had been described and illustrated by the naturalist Peter Brown in his book New Illustrations of Zoology. Joan Gideon Loten, an administrator in the Dutch East India Company had provided Brown with a picture of the owl that had been drawn by the Ceylonese artist Pieter Cornelis de Bevere. The brown fish owl is now placed in the genus Ketupa that was introduced in 1830 by the French naturalist René Lesson.

Four subspecies are recognised:

- K. z. semenowi Zarudny, 1905 – southeast Turkey, Middle East to northwest India
- K. z. leschenaulti (Temminck, 1820) – India through Myanmar to west Thailand
- K. z. zeylonensis (Gmelin, JF, 1788) – Sri Lanka
- K. z. orientalis Delacour, 1926 – northeast Myanmar to southeast China, Indochina and the Malay Peninsula

Results of a phylogenetic analysis of nine horned owl species indicate that Ketupa species form a monophyletic group.

=== Fossil records ===
In prehistoric times, this species may have been present across the central and eastern Mediterranean basin, in particular on islands. The Late Pleistocene Bubo insularis is typically considered to include the fragmentary remains originally described as Ophthalmomegas lamarmorae due to a mix-up with the fossil macaque Macaca majori and subsequently unstudied for many decades. Its fossil bones suggest a bird the size of a large spotted eagle-owl (B. africanus), a bit smaller still than the smallest living fish owls. It was certainly smallish but long-legged by eagle-owl standards, and its wing proportions differed conspicuously from a typical horned eagle owl. On the other hand, its leg and foot bones were more similar to those of a typical eagle-owl. Some consider it a specialized paleosubspecies of the brown fish owl that became extinct during the third Würm glaciation, while others reported remains of B. "insularis" in the Holocene of Sardinia and until the beginning of Roman Sardinia, with no subspecies being recognized.

The oldest remains date back at least to the Early Pliocene, about 5 million years ago. It was probably widely distributed around 120,000 years ago. After the onset of the last glacial period, less than 100,000 years ago, it disappeared from the western part of its range. The Late Miocene-Early Pliocene "Strix" perpasta is unlikely to belong in that genus, and also sometimes merged with B. insularis.

== Description ==
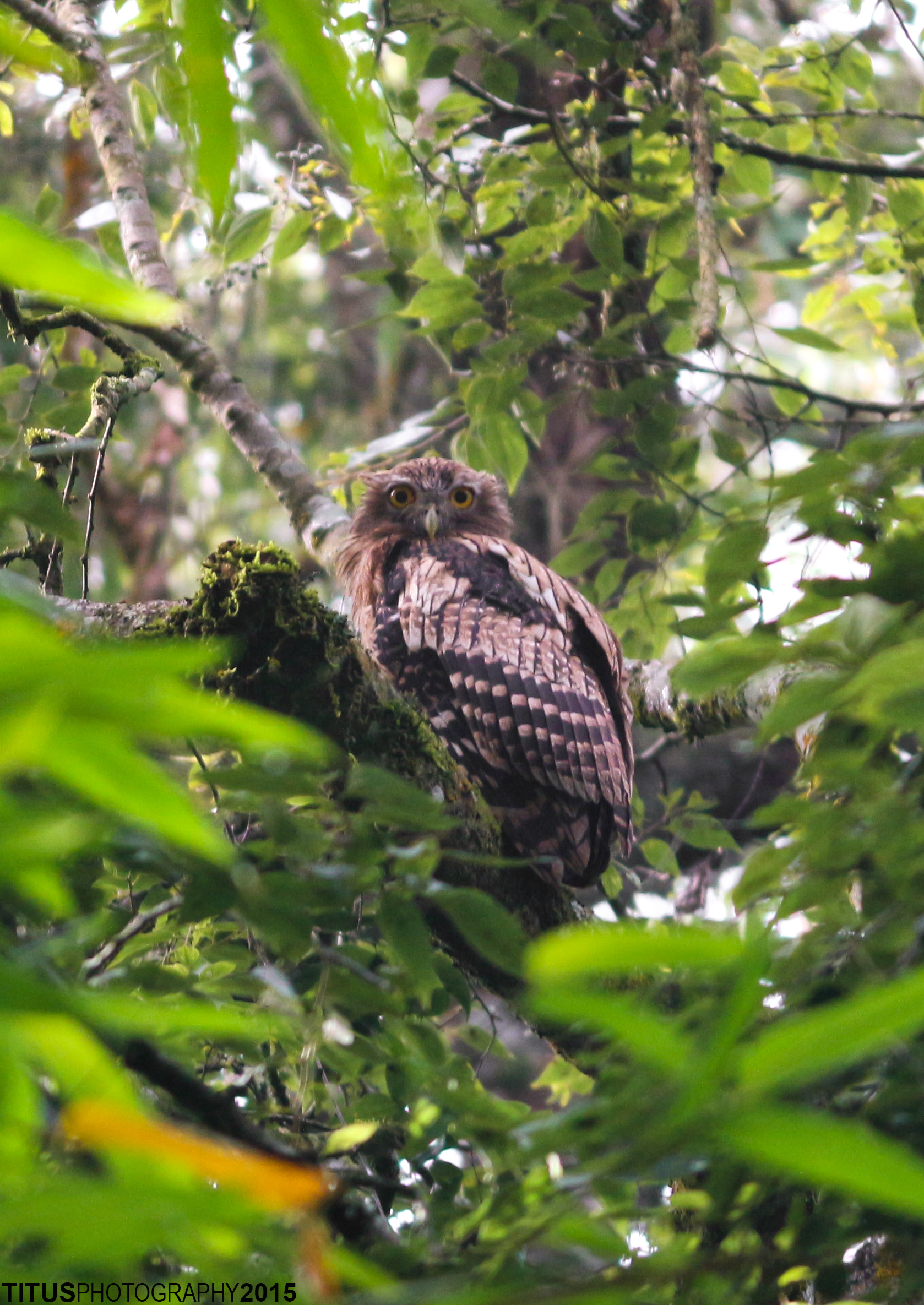
A juvenile at Sim's Park, Coonoor, Tamil Nadu

The brown fish owl has prominent ear tufts and rufous brown upperparts that are heavily streaked with black or dark brown. Its underparts are buffy-fulvous to whitish, with wavy dark brown streaks and finer brown barring. Its throat is white and conspicuously puffed. Its facial disk is indistinct, the bill dark and the iris golden yellow. Its featherless feet are yellow. Two-year old brown fish owls are somewhat paler than adults. Female and male differ slightly in size.

In body size, it ranges from 48 to 61 cm (19 to 24 in) with a wingspan from 125 to 140 cm (49 to 55 in). Its weight varies considerably, ranging from 1.1 to 2.5 kg (2.4 to 5.5 lb). Some of the variability is attributed to the range of sizes across the subspecies. Also, females are invariably at least somewhat larger than males and condition of birds is variable. It is slightly larger than the buffy fish owl with a darker brown hue.

Compared to eagle owls of similar length, fish owls tend to be even shorter in tail length and even heavier in build, have relatively larger wings, have considerably longer legs, and have a rough texture to the bottom of their toes. At least the latter two features are clear adaptations to aid these owls in capturing fish. Diurnal raptors who feed largely on fish have similar, if not identical, rough texture under their toes, which helps these birds grasp slippery fish. Unlike diurnal raptors who capture fish such as the osprey (Pandion haliaetus) as compared to most terrestrial raptors, the fish owls have large, powerful, and curved talons and a longitudinal sharp keel sitting under the middle claw with all having sharp cutting edges that are very much like those of eagle owls. Also, unlike fish-eating diurnal raptors will not submerge any part of their body while hunting, preferring only to put their feet into the water, although fish owls will hunt on foot, wading into the shallows. Unlike most owls, the feathers of fish owls are not soft to the touch and they lack the comb and hair-like fringes to the primaries, which allow other owls to fly silently in order to ambush their prey. Due to the lack of these feather-specializations, fish owl wing beats make sounds. The brown fish owl in particular is said to have a noisy wing beat, sometimes described as producing a singing sound, but another description claimed they could be "as silent as any other owl" in flight. The lack of a deep facial disc in fish owls is another indication of the unimportance of sound relative to vision in these owls, as facial disc depth (as well as inner ear size) are directly related to how important sound is to an owl's hunting behavior. Also different from most any other kind of owl, the bill is placed on the face between the eyes rather below it, which is said to impart this fish owl with a "remarkably morose and sinister expression". Similar adaptations, such as unwillingness to submerge beyond their legs and lack of sound-muffling feathers are also seen in the African fishing owls, which do not seem to be directly related. The brown fish owl has sometimes been regarded as conspecific with the Blakiston's fish owl (B. blakistoni), but there is an approximately 2,000 km (1,200 mi) gap in their distributions, not to mention a large number of physical differences not the least of which is the Blakiston's considerably greater size.

=== Subspecies ===
- Sri Lankan brown fish owl (K. zeylonensis zeylonensis) is the smallest and darkest coloured subspecies with a wing chord of 355 to 405 mm (14.0 to 15.9 in), a tarsus of 85 to 90 mm (3.3 to 3.5 in), a tail of 177 to 206 mm (7.0 to 8.1 in), and a bill of 42 to 48 mm (1.7 to 1.9 in). The wing length averages 92% shorter than in northern subspecies. One male was found to have weighed 1,100 g (2.4 lb).
- Common brown fish owl (K. z. leschenaultii) occurs from the Indian subcontinent to Myanmar and Thailand. It is of medium hue with lighter markings than the nominate subspecies. It has a wing chord of 370 to 430 mm (15 to 17 in), a tail of 186 to 210 mm (7.3 to 8.3 in), a tarsus of 71 to 90 mm (2.8 to 3.5 in) and a bill of 49 to 52 mm (1.9 to 2.0 in). The wing chord of 16 males in India averaged 402 mm (15.8 in) and their bills averaged 49 mm (1.9 in) while 15 females averaged 395 mm (15.6 in) in wing chord and 51.5 mm (2.03 in) in bill length. A male was found to weigh 1,105 g (2.436 lb) and a female was found to weigh 1,308 g (2.884 lb).
- Western brown fish owl (K. z. semenowi) occurs from southern Turkey through Iran and Pakistan to northeastern India. It is paler and slightly larger than the common brown fish owl with a somewhat tawny hue. Its wing chord is 396 to 434 mm (15.6 to 17.1 in) with a tarsus of 74 to 90 mm (2.9 to 3.5 in), a tail of 197 to 214 mm (7.8 to 8.4 in) and a bill of 49 to 54 mm (1.9 to 2.1 in).
- Eastern brown fish owl (K. z. orientalis) occurs in north-eastern Myanmar, Vietnam and southeastern China and Hainan Island. It is somewhat darker than the common brown fish owl with a larger tarsus. Its wing chord is 365 to 457 mm (14.4 to 18.0 in), with a tail of 195 to 210 mm (7.7 to 8.3 in) and a tarsus of 67 to 70 mm (2.6 to 2.8 in).

== Distribution and habitat ==
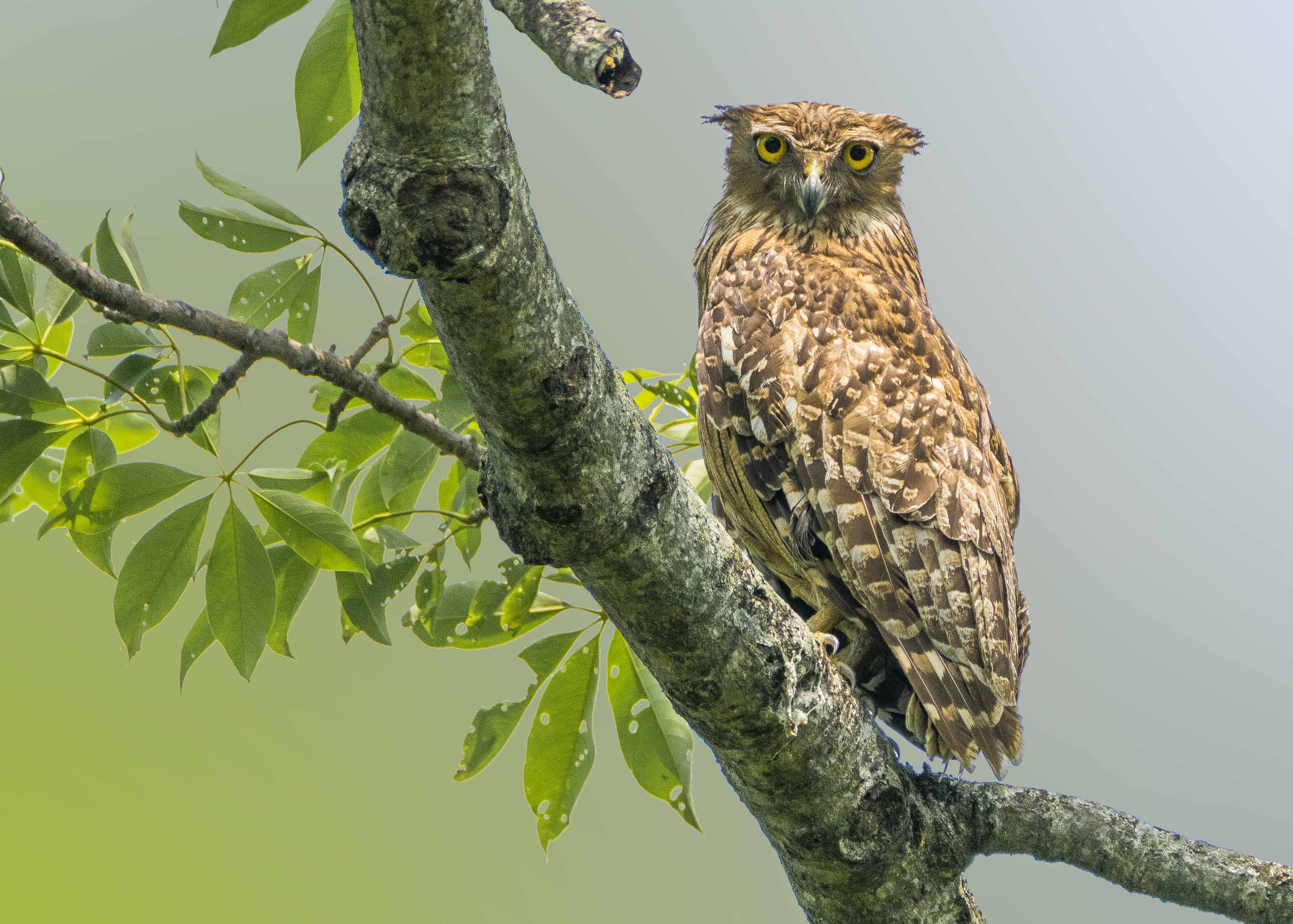
An adult Brown Fish Owl at Barpeta Assam by Hedayeat Ullah

The brown fish owl is an all-year resident throughout most tropical and subtropical parts of the Indian subcontinent to Southeast Asia and adjoining regions. West of its main range, it is patchily distributed to the Levant (possibly extinct) and southern Asia Minor (recently rediscovered). The typical habitat of brown fish owls is forest and woodland bordering streams, lakes or rice fields. It inhabits mainly the lowlands, from open woodland to dense forest as well as in plantations; in the Himalayas foothills it ranges into submontane forest up to 1,500 m (4,900 ft) above mean sea level or so but not higher. It frequently spends the day in stands of bamboo or other large shady trees. They be found around water reservoirs, along canals, on the outskirts of villages and along sea coasts. Western birds are found in semiarid landscape and may breed in oases in arid regions. Regardless of habitat, it rarely strays far from larger bodies of water such as rivers and lakes. Being a large predatory bird, the brown fish owl is only rarely found at a high population density, an exception being Sri Lanka, where this particular owl's adaptability to human habitat change has been beneficial in continued high numbers.

== Behaviour and ecology ==
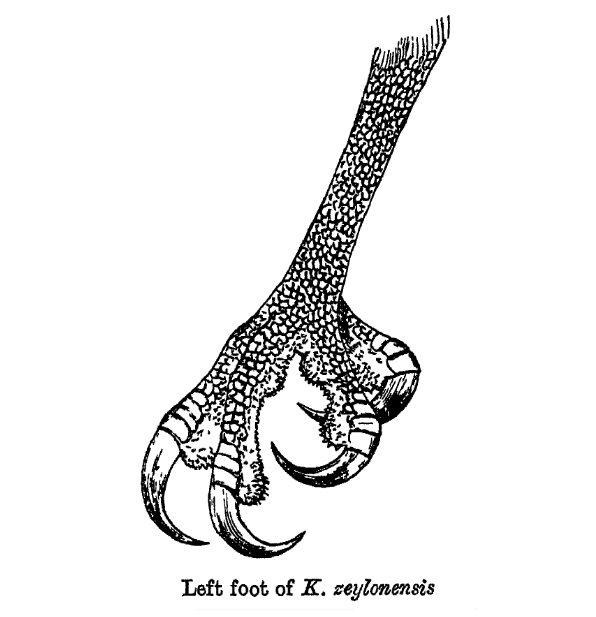
Foot showing adaptations to catch fish

The calls of the buffy fish owl are described as a deep humming boom-uh-boom, a hup hup hu and a loud huhuhuhuhuhuhu. A trisyllabic tu-hoo-hoo is seemingly the territorial song emitted before breeding. Its call has been described as comparable to that of a distant Eurasian bittern (Botaurus stellaris).

The buffy fish owl is nocturnal but can often be located by the small birds that mob it while roosting in a tree. However, in some areas it may be semi-diurnal and has been seen hunting during daytime, especially in cloudy weather. Brown fish owl primarily hunt by stationing itself on a rock overhang or hanging perch over water, or by wading into shallow waters. It grabs food by gliding over the water, nearly skimming it with its feet and grabbing its prey by quickly extending its long legs. It feeds mainly on fishes, frogs and aquatic crustaceans, especially Potamon crabs. It usually selects the larger freshwater fish available in waterways. Compared to the tawny fish owl, which prefers flowing waters, brown fish owls frequently hunt in still or stagnant waters. By number in the Melghat Tiger Reserve in India, freshwater crabs of the family Gecarcinucidae (of genus Barytelphusa) almost totally dominated the diet. Brown fish owls may be attracted to ornamental fish ponds or commercial fisheries in order to exploit the easily caught fish at such locations. Amniotes, in particular terrestrial ones, are seldom taken. However, other recorded foods have included snakes, lizards, water beetles, other insects, small mammals (including bats) and occasionally water birds. In Melghat, the largest biomass of food consisted of small mammals, namely rats (Rattus ssp.), other types of murids and Asian house shrews (Suncus murinus). Birds hunted by brown fish owls have including lesser whistling duck (Dendrocygna javanica) and Indian pond heron (Ardeola grayii). One unusual prey item recorded was a 28 cm (11 in) long monitor lizard. Competition may occur between this species and Pallas's fish eagles (Haliaeetus leucoryphus) as well as dusky eagle owls (B. coromandus), but the brown fish owl is more terrestrial than the fish eagle and consumes more invertebrates than either of those species, the eagle feeding mainly on fish followed by water birds and the eagle owl feeding mainly on mammals followed by land birds. If hungry, brown fish owls will scavenge carrion, a rare behavior for owls. A case where a putrefying crocodile (Crocodylus ssp.) carcass was consumed by this species was observed.

As mentioned above, the prehistoric B. insularis is sometimes included in the brown fish owl. If this is correct, the different foot anatomy, more similar to that of a typical eagle-owl, would imply that the population had shifted back to terrestrial prey. A likely prey item in this case would have been the Sardinian pika (Prolagus sardus). It has been conjectured that the owls disappeared with their prey due to climate change, but the giant pikas of Sardinia and Corsica still existed around 1750, finally succumbing to habitat destruction, introduced predatory mammals and overhunting soon thereafter.

=== Reproduction ===
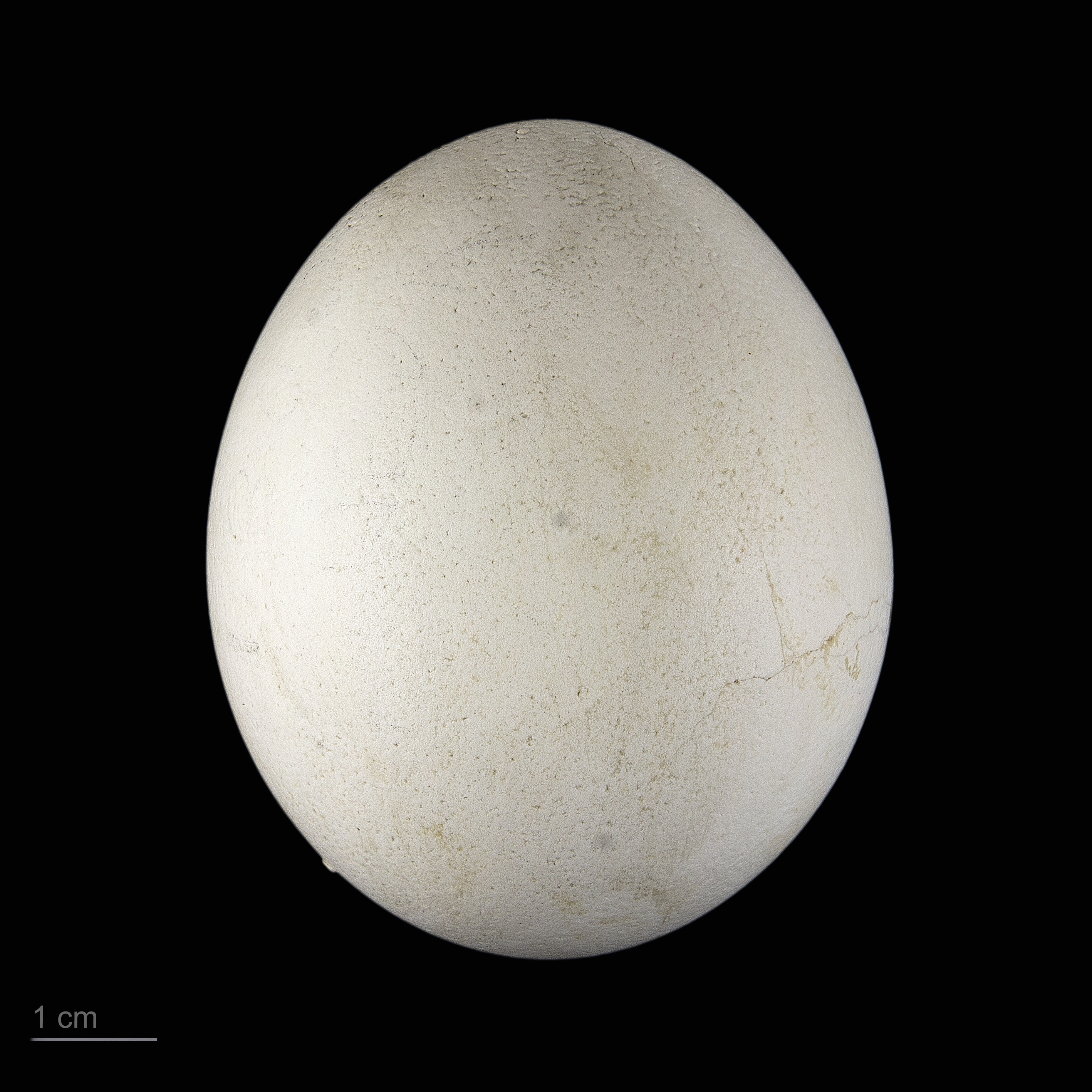
Egg of the brown fish owl

Brown fish owls breed from November to April, with activity tending to peak a bit earlier in the north of their breeding range and a bit later in the more tropical south of their breeding range. The breeding season is concurrent with the dry season, which has the benefit of low water levels and thus crabs and fish being more readily assessible. However, most other owls and diurnal raptors also primarily breed in the dry season as well. As owls do not build nest, brown fish owls are somewhat opportunistic when it comes to nesting sites. Brown fish owls frequently nest in shady spots such as old-growth mango trees (Mangifera ssp.), fig trees, including Ficus religiosa and Ficus benghalensis, Shorea robusta and other large trees in lowland forests. Outside of the bare surface of large branches, nests are often in spots such as overgrown eroded ravines and steep riverbanks with natural holes. However, it may also nest near suitable villages, along wet roadsides, jheels, canals and rice fields. Usually nest are large natural holes, in hollows or at the base of large branches. Deserted nest built by fish eagles and vultures are also sometimes used as nesting locations. Other nesting sites have included rock ledges, caves in shady cliff faces and stone ruins. The clutch is two or occasionally just one egg. 10 eggs in India averaged 58.4 mm × 48.9 mm (2.30 in × 1.93 in) in sizes, with eggs of fish owls to the north averaging slightly larger. Incubation is 38 days or somewhat less, and the young fledge after about seven weeks. The downy chicks are mostly an off-white color and develop into a paler version of adults by their second year.

== Threats ==
Apparently in India, during the festival of Diwali, thousands of owls are killed - though programs to counter this practice are underway - including this species due to superstitious beliefs about the evil nature of owls and as an attempt to gain the power of black magic. Habitat destruction will eventually cause the species to desert a region. Due to this, it seems to be extinct as a breeding bird in Israel nowadays, attributable largely to damming practices leading to drying up of many waterways. In Israel, it was decimated by the use of the rodenticide thallium(I) sulfate, which in addition to potential direct exposure through rodents also poisons surface waters.
