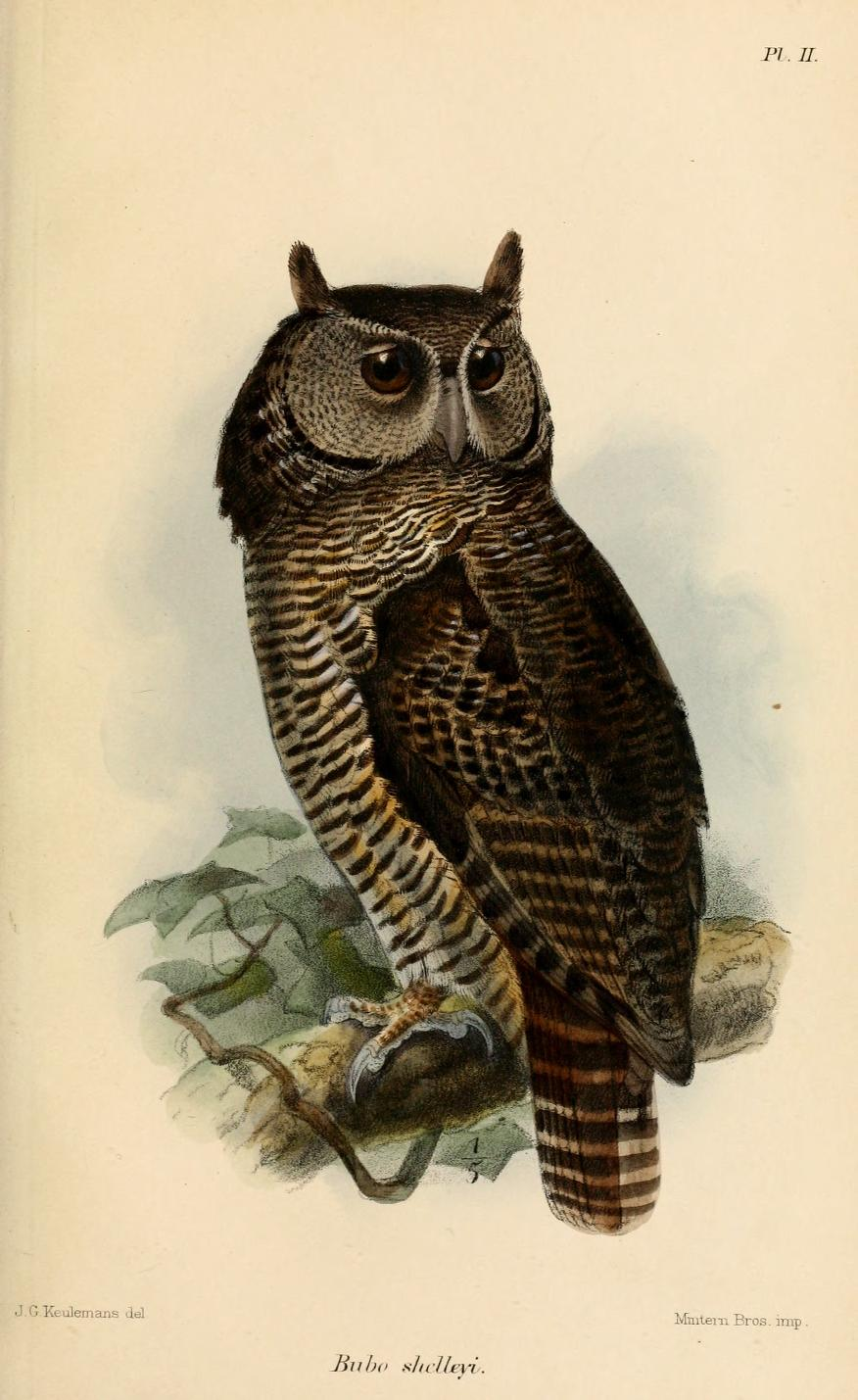
- Illustration by Keulemans, 1875

Conservation status
- Vulnerable (IUCN 3.1)
- CITES Appendix II

Scientific classification
- Kingdom: Animalia
- Phylum: Chordata
- Class: Aves
- Order: Strigiformes
- Family: Strigidae
- Genus: Ketupa
- Species: K. shelleyi

Binomial name
- Ketupa shelleyi (Sharpe & Ussher, 1872)

= Shelley's eagle-owl =

Species of owl

Shelley's eagle-owl (Ketupa shelleyi) is a species of owl in the family Strigidae. Despite its large size, it is a very little-known, rarely studied owl that occurs in very small numbers. A specimen was photographed in the wild for the first time on 16 October 2021 in the Atewa Range Forest Reserve in southeastern Ghana.

== Taxonomy ==
Shelley's eagle-owl was formally described in 1872 by the English ornithologist Richard Bowdler Sharpe and the colonial administrator Herbert Taylor Ussher based on a specimen procured in the Fante region of southern Ghana. They coined the binomial name Huhua shelleyi where the specific epithet was chosen to honour the ornithologist and collector George Ernest Shelley. Shelley's eagle-owl was formerly placed in the genus Bubo but is now one twelve owl species placed in the genus Ketupa that was introduced by the French naturalist René Lesson in 1830. The species is monotypic, no subspecies are recognised.

== Description ==
This dark eagle-owl is among the largest owls in the world and by far the largest eagle-owl found in the African rainforests. The total length of the species is 53 to 61 cm (21 to 24 in). The wing chord measured from 420 to 492 mm (16.5 to 19.4 in), its tail is about 233 to 266 mm (9.2 to 10.5 in) , the tarsus at 76 to 84 mm (3.0 to 3.3 in) and the total bill at 56 to 62 mm (2.2 to 2.4 in). A single male was reported to have weighed 1,257 g (2.8 lb), with females presumably attaining rather higher weights. Going on standard measurements, the Shelley's eagle-owl would appear to be even larger than the aforementioned total length and body mass suggest. In the key aspects of wing and tarsal lengths, Shelley's eagle-owl appears to be broadly similar in size to the Verreaux's eagle-owl, which is usually considered to be Africa's largest owl species, and it may be one of the largest tropical owls in the world. The bill of the Shelley's eagle-owl is proportionally massive and seemingly the second longest of any living owl behind only the Blakiston's fish owl.

Its upperparts are dark sooty black-brown overlaid with light barring. The underparts are whitish with heavy dark barring. Lighter and darker morphs are known. The light morphs have an off-white to pale tawny facial disc, with a prominent rim marked with a blackish-brown border. In the light morph, the crown and mantle are dusky brown overlaid with buffy-whitish bars. The dark morph is much darker brown above with sparse orange-buff barring, a darker facial disc and a scaly-looking brownish chest. The tail and the flight feathers of all are barred with brownish colouration of light and dark. The eyes are dark brown and the feet and almost the entirety of the toes are feathered. The juvenile of the Shelley's eagle-owl has large areas of white about the head with sooty barring.

=== Identification ===
It is the only large, heavily-built eagle owl in Africa with such barred patterning. Other eagle-owls co-exist with the Shelley's eagle-owl in the rainforest but conspicuously differ in most outward respects. The Akun eagle-owl is much smaller and less barred with pale yellow eyes and bare, yellow toes. Fraser's eagle-owl is also considerably smaller, has less barring, a warmer tawny overall colouration, and bare, bluish-grey toes. The similarly-sized Verreaux's eagle-owl does not usually co-exist but some abutting ranges in West Africa may occur. The Verreaux's eagle-owl does not occur in deep forest and the Shelley's has never been recorded outside of it, but it is conceivable that either may seldom visit Forest-savanna mosaics. If overlaps do occur, the Verreaux's is significantly paler, subtler and greyer with conspicuous pink eyelids.

== Distribution and habitat ==
This species is found in Central and Western Africa. It has been found in widely scattered locations, perhaps isolated by habitat destruction. One isolated population is thought to live in a small area of inland Liberia, as well as adjacent extreme southeast Sierra Leone, western Ivory Coast and the southeastern tips of Guinea. An isolated population may persist in southern Ghana. The largest probable population is in southern Cameroon (also possibly extreme southern Nigeria), much of the non-coastal parts of Equatorial Guinea and Gabon, the Republic of the Congo and a large swath of northern Democratic Republic of the Congo, perhaps reaching Uganda. It is a resident of lowland, tropical rainforests and has never been collected outside densely forested and old growth areas.

== Behaviour ==
The Shelley's eagle-owl is a nocturnal bird which spends its days roosting in dense foliage, reportedly often at quite low levels in trees. Few living wild specimens have ever been studied and until 2021 the species was never known to have been photographed in the wild. Persistent singing by the species has been heard in March, at least in Liberia. The typical call is a loud, wailing kooouw (very different and much higher pitched from the typical calls of other eagle-owls of large size, which often call with sonorous hoots) given at intervals of several seconds. A loud peeping sound has also been reported, possibly in times of stress. Heard far more often than it is seen, Shelley's eagle-owls are said to vocalize most persistently at or just before dawn and around dusk.

=== Breeding ===
Details of the species' breeding habits are not generally known and only incidental observations have been made. In Democratic Republic of the Congo various stages of development were witnessed in different months: recently fledged young in April, a large nestling in September and a juvenile in mesoptile plumage in early November. Additionally, an adult was seen roosting with a probable juvenile in December in the Cameroon.

=== Feeding ===
The powerful talons and feet of the species suggest that its preferred prey consists of medium-sized mammals and large birds. The only confirmed wild prey was a large, unidentified flying squirrel. In captivity, Shelley's eagle-owls require about 110 g (3.9 oz) of food a day, mainly consisting of rodents.

== Status and conservation ==
Only 20 specimens of this species are known to have been collected. Further studies, especially of the life history of Shelley's eagle-owls, are badly needed. Based on this clear scarcity, it appears to be a very local and very rare bird. Due to its habitation of dense rainforest, it is clear that the species is threatened by any habitat loss within its native range. The habitat destruction of the Guinean Forests of West Africa has been rampant as well as in the Congolian rainforests, thus compromising nearly all of this species' range. A very rough estimate of 1,500–7,000 individuals, and almost certainly less than 10,000 individuals, has been claimed to be living in the wild. Due to the epidemic levels of clearcutting and seemingly very low population densities, this species was uplisted to Vulnerable by the IUCN in 2018, after an initial uplisting in 2004 to Near Threatened.
