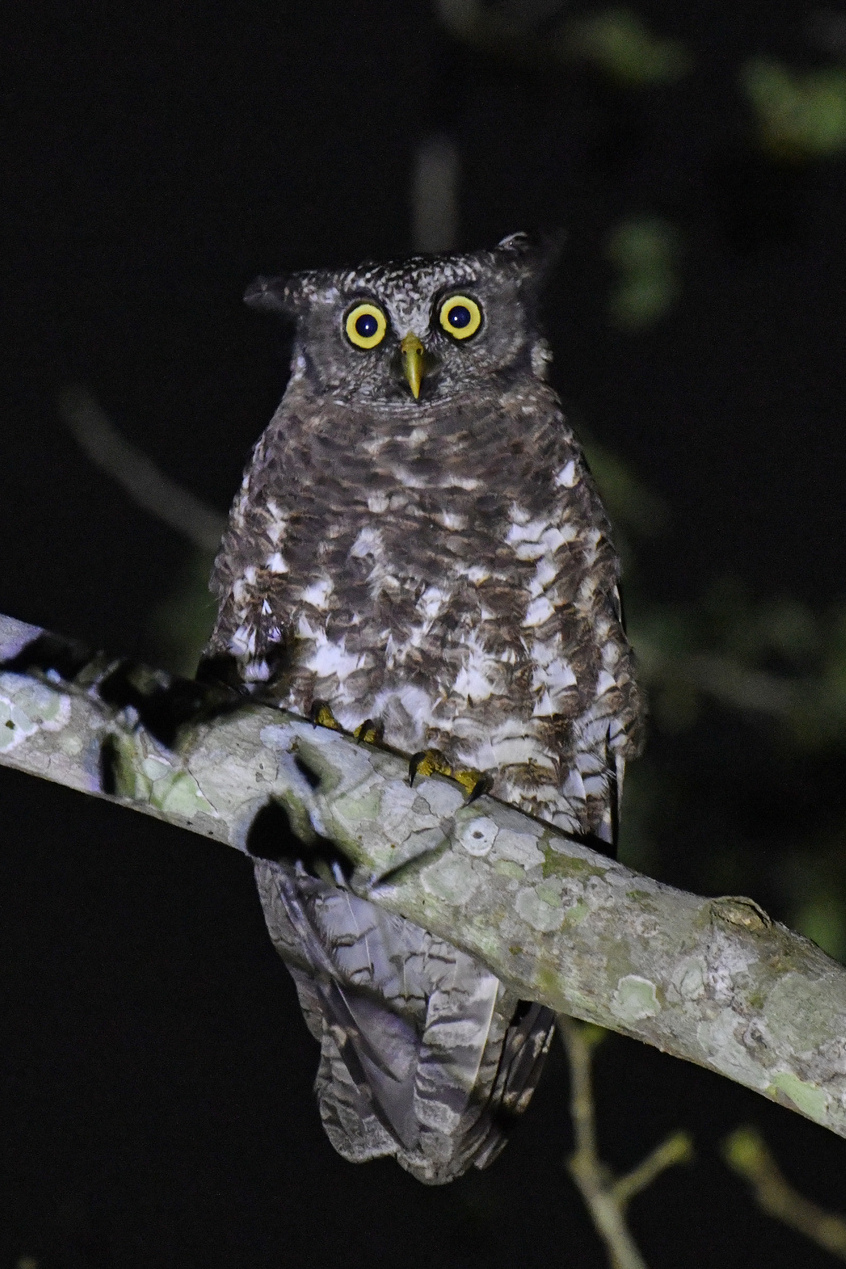
- Akun Eagle-Owl (Ketupa leucosticta) in Ghana

Conservation status
- Least Concern (IUCN 3.1)
- CITES Appendix II

Scientific classification
- Kingdom: Animalia
- Phylum: Chordata
- Class: Aves
- Order: Strigiformes
- Family: Strigidae
- Genus: Ketupa
- Species: K. leucosticta

Binomial name
- Ketupa leucosticta (Hartlaub, 1855)

= Akun eagle-owl =

Species of owl

The akun eagle-owl (Ketupa leucosticta) is a species of owl in the family Strigidae and is native to the African tropical rainforest.

== Taxonomy ==
The akun eagle-owl was formally described in 1855, by the German ornithologist Gustav Hartlaub from a specimen collected in Ghana. Hartlaub placed the owl in the genus Bubo and coined the binomial name Buco leucostictus. The specific epithet leucostictus is from Ancient Greek leukostiktos which means "white-speckled". The akun eagle-owl is now placed in the genus Ketupa that was introduced in 1831 by the French naturalist René Lesson. The species is monotypic: no subspecies are recognised. The common English name, akun, is from the local name for the owl in southwest Cameroon. The local name "Akuñ" was recorded by the collector George Latimer Bates near Grand Batanga and published in 1904, by English ornithologist Richard Bowdler Sharpe.

== Description ==
The akun eagle-owl is one of the smaller eagle-owls, with 40–46 cm length; and body weight of 486–536 g for males and 524–607 g for females. It has predominantly dark to reddish-brown head and upperparts, with pale, dusky brown bars on the wings and back, and white markings around the shoulders. There are two large "ear" tufts on the head which are dark brown accompanied with white spots, while the eyes are pale yellow. The upper breast is light reddish-brown and marked with dark bars, while the lower breast, belly and vent are white, with reddish-brown vermiculations and large blackish spots. Juveniles have a whitish head and body, with reddish-brown barring and brown wings and tail. The usual call is a low, accelerating, clucking rattle and when alarmed it produces an unusual quacking sound.

== Distribution and habitat ==
The akun eagle-owl has a patchy range that extends through a number of the west African countries which have coastlines on the Gulf of Guinea, from Guinea east to Cameroon and south to Angola, extending inland into the southern Central African Republic, Congo and northern parts of the Democratic Republic of Congo.

The Akun eagle-owl is found mainly in lowland primary and secondary rainforest, particularly around forest edges and clearings, and also along the edges of rivers and on forested river islands.

== Behaviour and ecology ==
Like most owls the akun eagle-owl is a nocturnal species emerging from its daytime roost at dusk to hunt. It's unusual for an eagle owl in that it apparently feeds almost exclusively on insects, its small feet and a relatively weak bill prevent it from tackling larger prey. Its main prey are beetles, cicadas and locusts, which are either gleaned from foliage or taken in flight before being brought back to a perch, held in the feet and ripped into small pieces with the bill. Little is known regarding the breeding biology of the Akun eagle-owl. In west Africa it appears to lay eggs around the period from November to January, and young owlets have been recorded in the nest in Liberia between February and April. As in some other eagle-owls, the Akun eagle-owl builds its nest on the ground.
