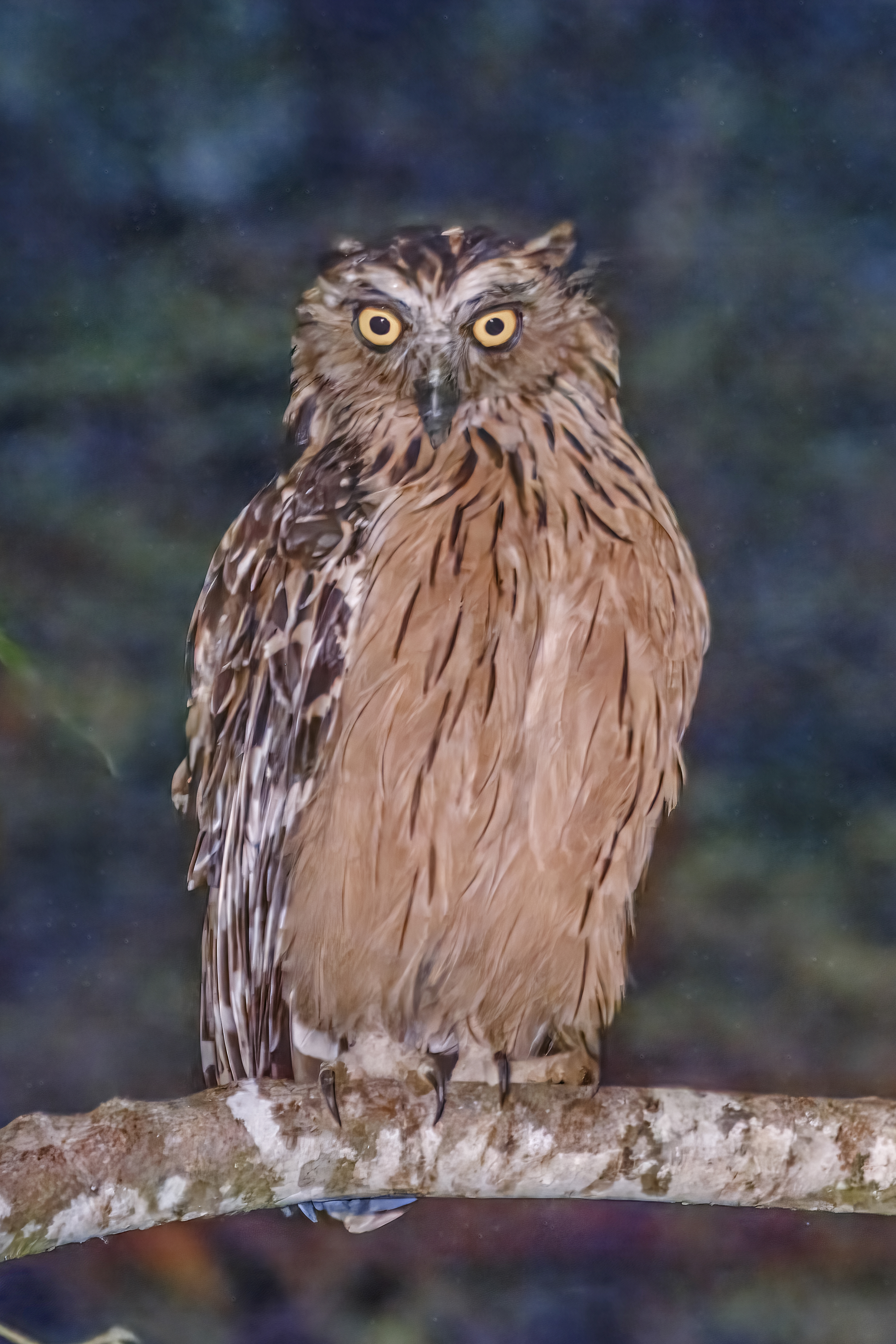
- near Kinabatangan River, Sabah, Malaysia

Conservation status
- Least Concern (IUCN 3.1)
- CITES Appendix II

Scientific classification
- Kingdom: Animalia
- Phylum: Chordata
- Class: Aves
- Order: Strigiformes
- Family: Strigidae
- Genus: Ketupa
- Species: K. ketupu

Binomial name
- Ketupa ketupu (Horsfield, 1821)

= Buffy fish owl =

Species of owl

The buffy fish owl (Ketupa ketupu), also known as the Malay fish owl, is a fish owl in the family Strigidae. It is native to Southeast Asia and lives foremost in tropical forests and wetlands. Due to its wide distribution and assumed stable population, it is listed as least concern on the IUCN Red List since 2004.

== Taxonomy ==
Strix ketupu was the scientific name proposed by Thomas Horsfield in 1821 for a buffy fish owl collected in Java. Ketupa was proposed as generic name by René-Primevère Lesson in 1831 for fish owl species from Java and India. In the 19th and 20th centuries, several zoological specimens of buffy fish owls were described:

- Ketupa minor by Johann Büttikofer in 1896 were two small fish owls collected on Nias island with a wing chord of 29.5–30 cm (11.6–11.8 in), a tail of 14–14.5 cm (5.5–5.7 in), and a short bill of 3.5 cm (1.4 in).
- Bubo ketupu aagaardi by Oscar Neumann in 1935 was a pale fish owl specimen from Bangnara in Thailand with a wing chord of 31.5–34.5 cm (12.4–13.6 in).
- Bubo ketupu pageli also by Neumann in 1935 was a reddish fish owl from the mountains of northeastern Borneo with a wing chord of 31–33 cm (12–13 in).

Three are recognised today as Ketupa ketupu subspecies:

- K. k. ketupu (Horsfield, 1821) - West Bengal, Assam, southern Thailand and Vietnam, the Malay Peninsula to Riau Archipelago, Sumatra, Belitung, Java, Bali and much of Borneo
- K. k. pageli (Neumann, 1936) - northern Borneo
- K. k. minor Büttikofer, 1966 - endemic to Nias island.

K. k. aagaardi has been merged with K. k. ketupu. Merging the genus Ketupa into the genus Bubo has been suggested based on their close relationship in mitochondrial DNA and similarities in general appearance. Results of a phylogenetic analysis of nine horned owl species indicate that Ketupa species form a monophyletic group.

== Description ==
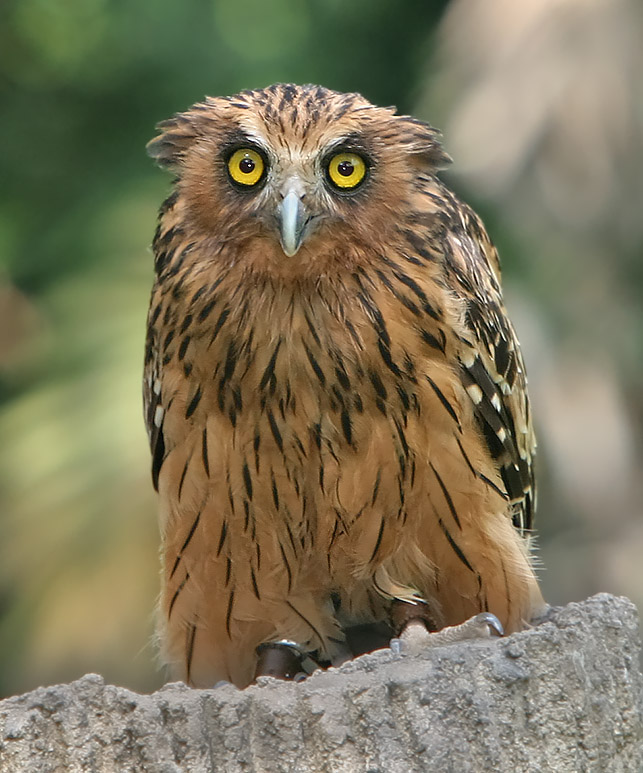
Male buffy fish-owl

The buffy fish owl is buff brown with darker tawny brown feathers on the back. Its face is paler and it has light brown eyebrows. With an adult size of 40 to 48 cm (16 to 19 in) and a weight of 1,028 to 2,100 g (36.3 to 74.1 oz), it is the smallest fish owl species.

Like all fish owls, the buffy fish owl has prominent ear tufts on the sides of its head. Its wing feathers and tail are broadly barred yellowish and dark brown. The wings are distinctly rounded in shape. The underparts are a yellowish brown, rich buff, or fulvous with broad, blackish shaft stripes. Its long legs are not feathered.

The fish owls have large, powerful, and curved talons and a longitudinal sharp keel underneath the middle claw, with all having sharp cutting edges that are very much like those of eagle owls. Unlike fish-eating diurnal raptors, they do not submerge any part of their body while hunting, preferring only to put their feet into the water, although fish owls wade into the shallows. The feathers of fish owls are not soft to the touch and lack the comb and hair-like fringes to the primaries, which allow other owls to fly silently to ambush their prey. Due to the lack of these feather specializations, fish owl wing beats make sounds. The lack of a deep facial disc in fish owls is another indication of the unimportance of sound relative to vision in these owls, as facial disc depth (as well as inner ear size) is directly related to how important sound is to an owl's hunting behavior. Also different from most any other kind of owl, the bill is placed on the face between the eyes rather than below it, which is said to impart this fish owl with a "remarkably morose and sinister expression". Similar adaptations, such as unwillingness to submerge beyond their legs and lack of sound-muffling feathers are also seen in the African fishing owls, which do not seem to be directly related. Due to their neat replacement of each other in range, at one time the tawny and buffy fish owls were considered the same species, but a number of physical, anatomical, habitat, and behavioral distinctions exist between them.

== Distribution and habitat ==
The buffy fish owl is distributed from Bangladesh, Myanmar, Thailand, Malaysia, and Singapore to Cambodia, Laos, Vietnam, and the Sunda Islands. On Cocos (Keeling) Island, it is nonbreeding. It inhabits tropical forests and freshwater wetlands near rivers, lakes, and aquaculture sites up to an elevation of 1,600 m (5,200 ft). It also lives in plantations and rural and urban gardens.

== Behaviour and ecology ==
A range of vocalizations has been attributed to the buffy fish owl. Among those recorded are included hissing sounds and a rattling kutook, repeated rapidly about seven times. Also recorded has been a ringing, loud pof-pof-pof and a high, hawk-like hie-e-e-e-e-keek series of notes. The buffy fish owl is rather noisy before breeding, and pairs may engage in bouts of duetting for several minutes at a time. During the daytime, it shelters often singly in densely foliaged trees.

=== Diet ===
The buffy fish owl feeds foremost on fish, crabs, frogs, small reptiles and birds. It also forages on carrion. Stomach content found in Javan buffy fish owls included insects, winged ants and winged termites, goldfish (Carassius auratus), gold-ringed cat snake (Boiga dendrophila), immature false gharials (Tomistoma schlegelii), red junglefowl (Gallus gallus), black rat (Rattus rattus), and fruit bats.

It has been recorded consuming remains of a crocodile and a Sunda stink badger (Mydaus javanensis). The buffy fish owl does not produce firm pellets as do most owls. Instead, bones and remains of frogs and insects are ejected in pieces and fall to the ground below the roost. Prey remains have only been found within the nest, never around or below the nest as is commonly recorded in other owls. The buffy fish owl hunts mainly from the bank, swooping down much in the manner of a fish eagle, but never getting its feathers wet. It also walks into shallow streams and brooks, additionally snatching food in such locations.

=== Reproduction ===
Eggs of buffy fish owls have mainly been found in February through April in western Java, less commonly into May, and in the Malay Peninsula also in September through January. The buffy fish owl frequently nests on top of a large fern (Asplenium nidus), but nests have also been recorded in the fork of a tall bough covered in ferns and moss, on orchid beds, and in tree holes. More rarely, rocky sites have been used as nesting sites, even behind waterfalls. The nest is usually merely a scrape into the surface of a fern with no structure or lining, as owls do not build nests. Abandoned bird nests built by other species have been used, including those of brahminy kite (Haliastur indus). Only one egg per breeding season has ever been recorded in a buffy fish owl nest, giving them the smallest clutch size of any owl alongside the spot-bellied eagle owl (B. nipalensis) and the barred eagle owl (B. sumatranus), which also have only ever been recorded with a single-egg clutch. The egg is round, oval, and dull white. The average dimensions of eggs in western Java were 57.4 mm × 47 mm (2.26 in × 1.85 in). Incubation of the eggs lasts 28 to 29 days and fledging occurs after six weeks. This species is generally faring well for a large raptorial bird and has been inadvertently aided by commercial fisheries and ornamental ponds, which they visit by night to hunt. Sometimes, they incur persecution from owners of such ponds for taking stock.

== Threats ==
During a seizure in 2008 in a storage facility in Johor, 14 frozen buffy fish owls were discovered that were supposed to be illegally exported to China. In Jakarta, buffy fish owls were offered for sale in three bird markets in 2010 and 2012. In 2015, 323 buffy fish owls were offered for sale through online raptor trading groups. Buffy fish owls were also traded at wildlife markets in Bandung, Garut, Surabaya, and Denpasar.

== Conservation ==
In Malaysia, owl species are protected by the Protection of Wild Life Act 1972 and listed by the Convention on International Trade in Endangered Species on Appendix II. Violation of this act is a punishable offense and is penalized with a fine of 3,000 Malaysian ringgit or two years in jail or both.

== Iconography ==
Cambodian Special Forces Command Counter-terrorist Group 14 used buffy fish owl as their insignia.
