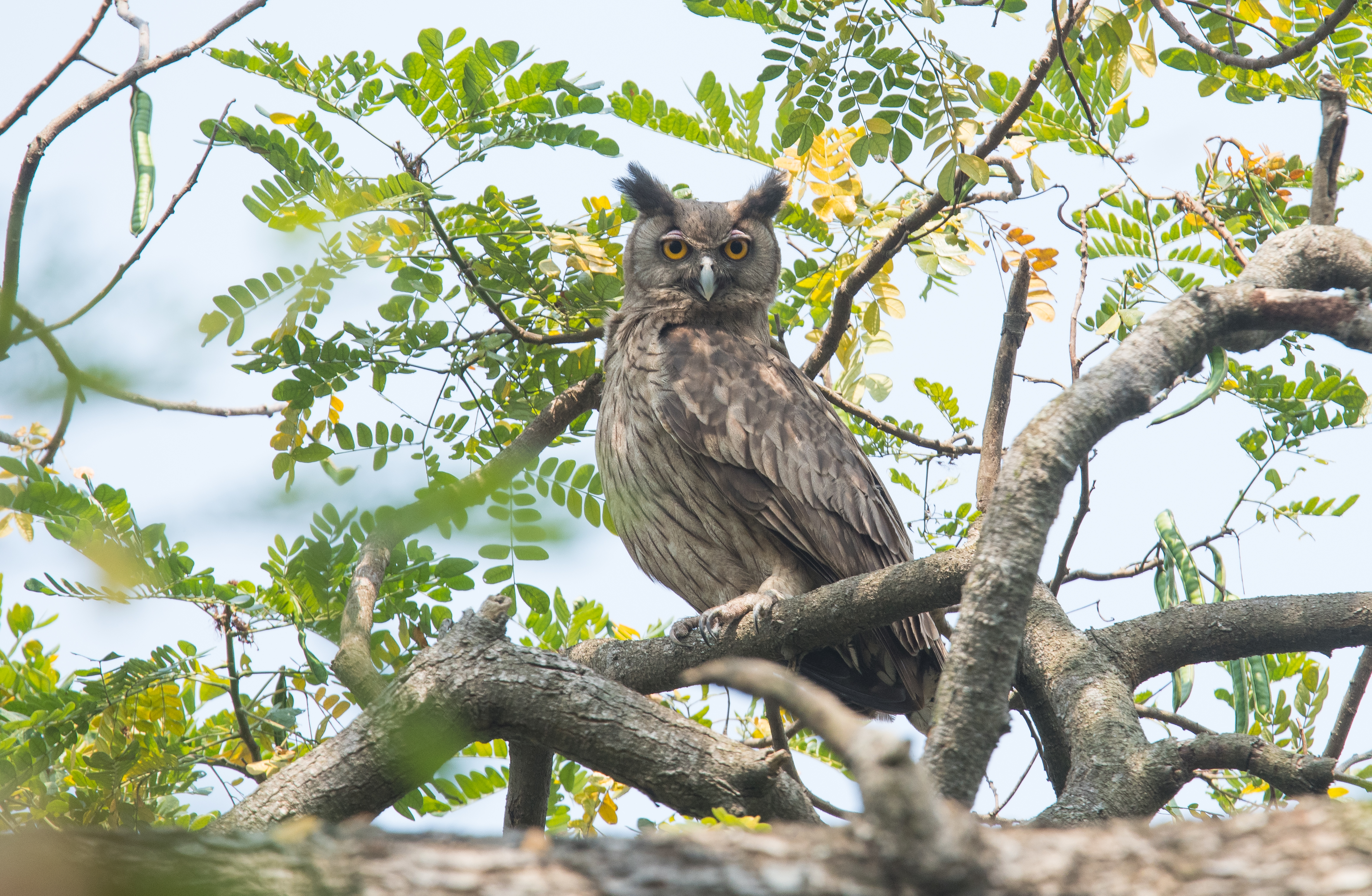

Conservation status
- Least Concern (IUCN 3.1)
- CITES Appendix II

Scientific classification
- Kingdom: Animalia
- Phylum: Chordata
- Class: Aves
- Order: Strigiformes
- Family: Strigidae
- Genus: Ketupa
- Species: K. coromanda

Binomial name
- Ketupa coromanda (Latham, 1790)

= Dusky eagle-owl =

Species of owl

The dusky eagle-owl (Ketupa coromanda) is an owl species in the family Strigidae that is widespread in South and Southeast Asia. The type specimen used to describe the species was collected on the Coromandel Coast, which was used for the specific epithet. It is listed as Least Concern on the IUCN Red List. The species's extent of occurrence is estimated at 9,250,000 km^{2} (3,570,000 sq mi). However, volunteer generated databases such as eBird.org suggest that the available extent of occurrence is a vast over-estimate.

== Taxonomy ==
The species was first described by John Latham in 1790 as Strix coromanda. This is the nominate subspecies that occurs in South Asia. In the 20th century, the following subspecies was described:

- Ketupa coromanda klossii described by Herbert C. Robinson in 1911 was an adult dark brown male eagle-owl collected in north Perak, Malaysia. Only four skins are known. This subspecies is thought to occur in Southeast Asia.

== Description ==
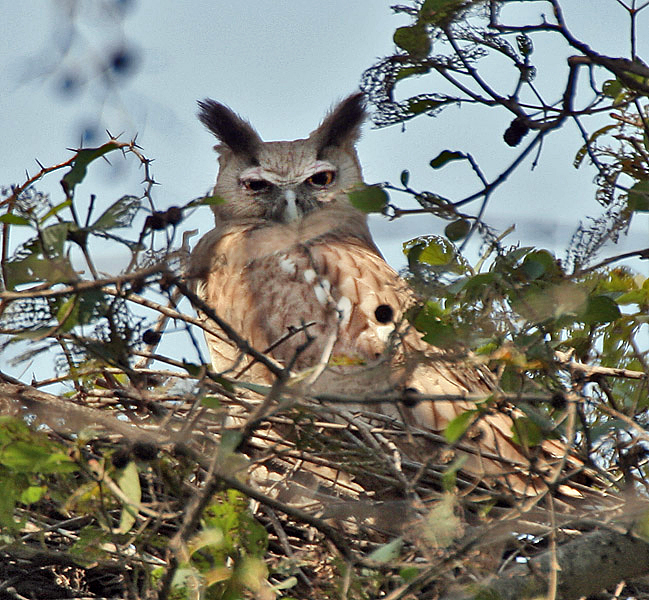
A dusky eagle-owl in Keoladeo National Park, Bharatpur, India.

The dusky eagle-owl is a large greyish-brown owl with prominent ear tufts. Its underparts are greyish white with some dark brown streaks, and its dark brown wings have some whitish streaks. K. c. klossii is similar to the nominate subspecies but much darker and with no obvious whitish markings on wings and scapulars. Wings are 380–435 mm, and tail is 187–224 mm.

== Distribution and habitat ==
The dusky eagle-owl occurs from Pakistan, India, Nepal and Bangladesh to Myanmar, Thailand, Malaysia into China. In Peninsular Malaysia, it has been recorded in oil palm plantations during surveys carried out between autumn 2009 and 2010 in the states of Selangor, Perak, Pahang and Negeri Sembilan.

It inhabits forests, wooded wetlands, agricultural areas with scattered groves and trees, and roadside avenues with old large trees.

== Behaviour and ecology ==
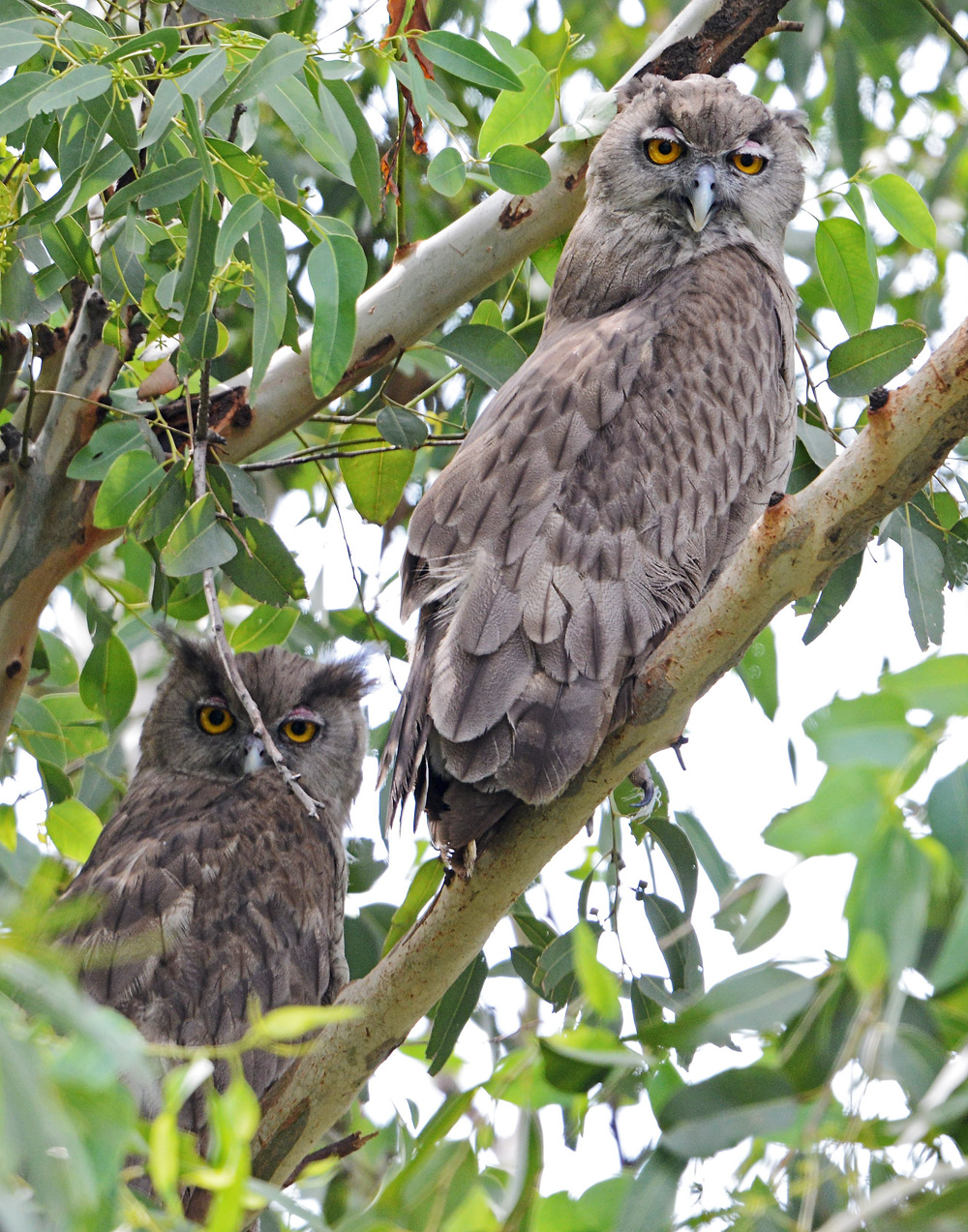
A dusky eagle-owl pair in Faridabad, Haryana, India

The dusky eagle-owl is not deterred by daylight though is largely active at night emerging from its roost shortly before sunset. The species has been seen hunting during the day during cloudy weather.

The nesting season is from November to April, with most of the breeding observed during December and January. The dusky eagle-owls use stick nests of other large birds on trees such as Ficus, Mitragyna and Dalbergia. In Haryana, breeding owl pairs preferentially reused nests of woolly-necked Storks Ciconia episcopus. Very few dusky eagle-owl pairs used nests made by other bird species, which included red-naped ibis Pseudibis papillosa and Indian spotted eagle Clanga hastata. Storks showed a preference for native Dalbergia sissoo and Ficus religiosa trees along with the exotic Eucalyptus trees. The owls exercised a second level of preference of tree species that had stork nests, and preferentially reused nests on Eucalyptus sp. Most dusky eagle-owls reused stork nests in areas that had high densities of stork nests suggesting that the owls were tracking the breeding progress of woolly-necked storks. The study in Haryana underscored the importance of multifunctional agriculture – agroforestry amid cereal crops – to maintain healthy breeding populations of dusky eagle-owls.

The dusky eagle owl species is one of the least studied owls in the world, and the majority of information on its biology is from anecdotal observations.
