= Rufous fishing owl =

Conservation status
- Vulnerable (IUCN 3.1)
- CITES Appendix II

Scientific classification
- Kingdom: Animalia
- Phylum: Chordata
- Class: Aves
- Order: Strigiformes
- Family: Strigidae
- Genus: Scotopelia
- Species: S. ussheri

Binomial name
- Scotopelia ussheri Sharpe, 1871

Species of owl

The rufous fishing owl (Scotopelia ussheri), also known as the rufous-backed fishing-owl or Ussher's fishing owl, is a species of owl in the family Strigidae. It is endemic to west Africa, where it is a highly localised resident along forest rivers.

== Taxonomy ==
The rufous fishing owl was formally described in 1871 by the English ornithologist Richard Bowdler Sharpe based on a specimen collected in the Fante region of southern Ghana and sent to London by the British colonial administrator Herbert Taylor Ussher. Sharpe coined the current binomial name Scotopelia ussheri where the specific epithet honours Ussher. The species is monotypic: no subspecies are recognised. The genus Scotopelia now includes two other more widely distributed African owls: the vermiculated fishing owl and Pel's fishing owl.

== Description ==
The rufous fishing owl is a medium-sized owl, measuring 46 to 51 cm (18 to 20 in) in length. This is substantially smaller than the Pel's fishing owl, which also occurs in the region. It lacks ear tufts and has an indistinct, pale cinnamon facial disc. The underparts are pale and are finely streaked due to the dark shafts of the majority of the feathers. The flanks may have a more rufous patch. The adults have barred flight feathers, with the upperparts of the wings (mantle, scapulars and wing-coverts) showing a mixture of rufous, creamy-buff and white. The mantle also has a few blackish marks.

While being substantially smaller, the juveniles have similar markings to the adults, particularly in their wings. The first-generation feathers, however, tend to be paler than those grown after the first moult, particularly on the underparts. Young birds may also appear stumpier, presumably due to their denser, fluffier feathers.

The feet and legs are bare and are yellowish-orange in colour. The bill is bluish grey, contrasting with a yellowish cere.

Their call is a low, deep, moaning or dove-like hoot. It may be repeated at regular intervals (about 15–20 seconds) for at least an hour. Pairs may also duet. A study carried out in Ivory Coast showed that the best responses to playback experiments occur in the small rainy season during the full moon.

== Distribution and habitat ==
The rufous fishing owl is endemic to west Africa. It is found in Ivory Coast, Ghana, Guinea, Liberia, and Sierra Leone, where it occurs as a highly localised resident along shady river banks. Its natural habitats are subtropical or tropical moist lowland forests and subtropical or tropical mangrove forests.

Although it lives in close proximity to the Pel's fishing owl, it has been suggested that they utilise the habitat differently. While the Pel's fishing owl is primarily found near larger, deeper water bodies, the rufous fishing owl seems to show a preference for smaller, shallower rivers. This may help explain why it has also been found in secondary forest, such as that near Kambama village, as long as there is suitable gallery forest where tree branches overhang the streams to provide fishing posts. It has also been observed to occur in plantations, suggesting that it may be more adaptable than previously believed.

== Behaviour ==
The habits of the rufous fishing owl are poorly known. It is believed that, like other fishing owls, this species is probably mainly nocturnal. Diurnal activity has, however, been rarely observed. An individual was imaged in a camera trap in 2009 in Sierra Leone at midday. Daytime hunting, however, has yet to be seen, suggesting that nocturnal behaviours are more common.

=== Diet ===
It is thought to mainly eat small fish. Catfish were also recorded in the stomach contents of a specimen from Sierra Leone. It may also feed freshwater crabs among other food items.

=== Breeding ===
Eggs have been laid in Sierra Leone in September and October and juveniles moulting out of juvenile into adult plumage, roughly six months after fledging, have been recorded in Liberia in July. It is thought that a single chick is the normal brood size.

== Status and conservation ==
It was formerly classified as endangered by the IUCN, however newer research showed that it is not as rare as was once believed. Consequently, it was downlisted to vulnerable in 2011. That being said, this species remains one of the rarest and least known owls species in the world and populations remain fragmented and continue to decline due to habitat loss.
