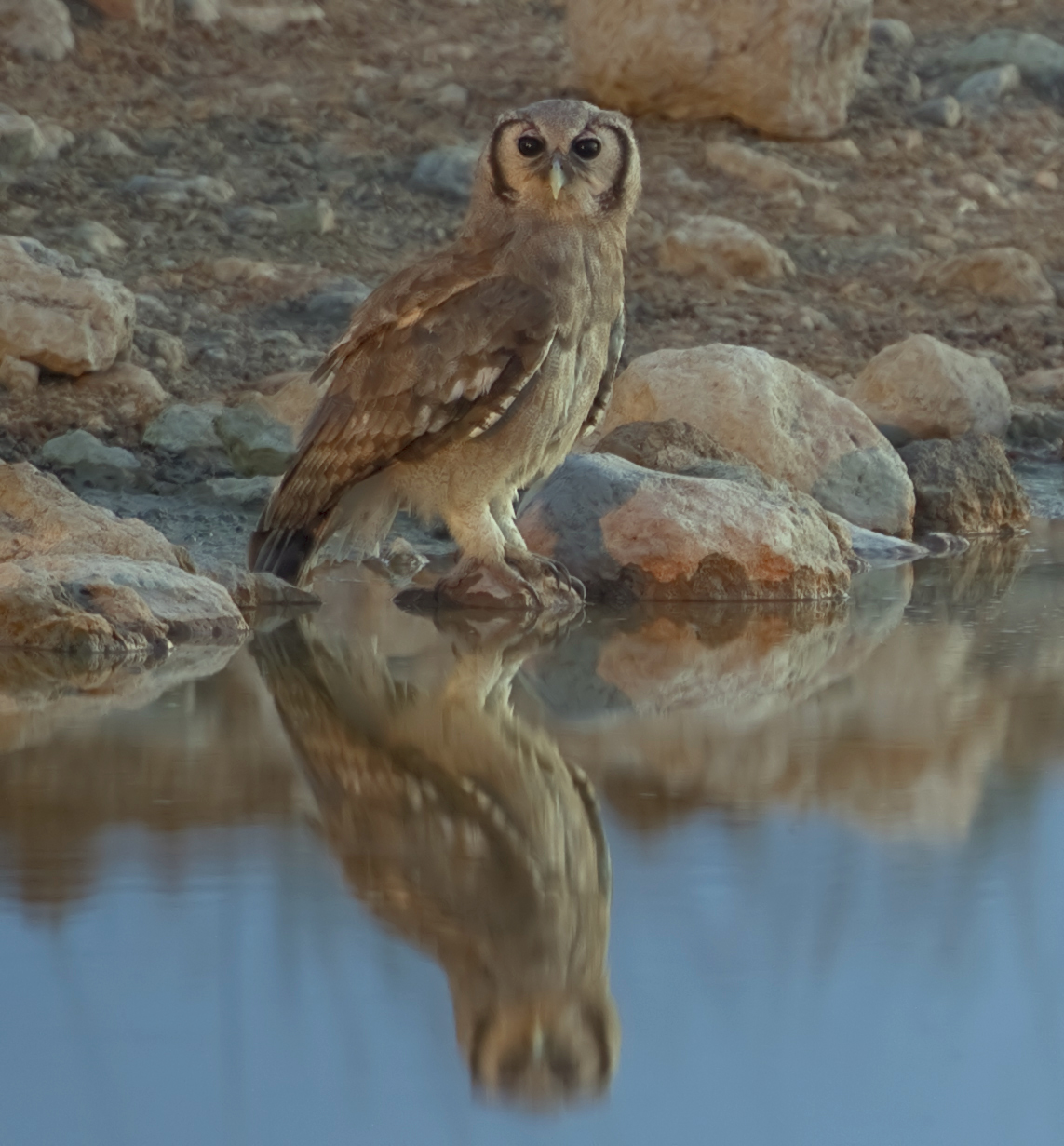
- From Etosha National Park

Conservation status
- Least Concern (IUCN 3.1)
- CITES Appendix II

Scientific classification
- Kingdom: Animalia
- Phylum: Chordata
- Class: Aves
- Order: Strigiformes
- Family: Strigidae
- Genus: Ketupa
- Species: K. lactea

Binomial name
- Ketupa lactea (Temminck, 1820)

= Verreaux's eagle-owl =

Species of owl

Verreaux's eagle-owl (Ketupa lactea), also commonly known as the milky eagle owl or giant eagle owl, is a large owl of the genus Ketupa in the family Strigidae. It is the largest African owl, measuring up to 66 cm (26 in) in total length. Widespread in sub-Saharan Africa, this eagle-owl is a resident primarily of dry, wooded savanna. The species is mainly grey in colour and is distinguishable by its bright pink eyelids, a unique feature not shared with any other owl species.

Verreaux's eagle-owl is a highly opportunistic predator equipped with powerful talons. Just over half of its known diet is composed of mammals, but equal numbers of birds and even insects may be hunted locally, along with any other appropriately sized prey that is encountered. This species is considered of Least Concern by IUCN, as it occurs over a wide range and has shown some adaptability to human-based alterations and destruction of habitat, also adapting to diverse prey when a primary prey species declines in a region. Although large in size and highly territorial, the Verreaux's eagle-owl does occur at fairly low densities, and some regional declines have been reported.

The common name commemorates the French naturalist Jules Verreaux. While still in his teens, Verreaux collected the type specimen that was later described by Temminck at the Rijksmuseum van Natuurlijke Historie.

== Taxonomy ==
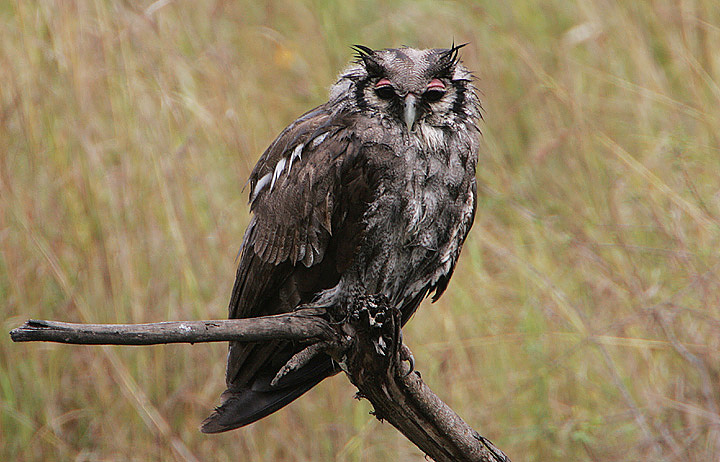
A Verreaux's eagle-owl during a rainstorm

There are no known subspecies in the Verreaux's eagle-owl, and there is remarkably little variation in their appearance across their considerable distribution. Reportedly, birds in the southern part of their range appear marginally larger on average but these size differences are quite subtle and may be considered as a mild case of Bergmann's rule. While genetic research has been undertaken for this species, its closest living relative in the genus Ketupa is not fully clear. At one time, the Verreaux's eagle-owl was mentioned as an owl with particularly mysterious genetic alliances among living owls. Per Konig & Weick (2008), the species with studied genetic markers found to be most closely related are a dark-eyed species pair of Asian eagle-owls, the spot-bellied (Ketupa nipalensis) and barred eagle-owls (Ketupa sumatrana), but these are not particularly closely related to the Verreaux's.

Among species with available genomes to study for DNA characteristics, it has been revealed that the fish owls, in particular the brown fish owl (Ketupa zeylonensis), is the third most closely related species to the Verreaux's. The Verreaux's eagle-owl along with 7 other species (including the aforementioned spot-bellied and barred eagle-owls) were formerly classified in the genus Bubo but they along with their fish owl cousins were found to be sufficiently divergent to qualify as the separate genus Ketupa. Notably, Konig & Weick did not test the DNA of other African eagle-owls that may bear relation to the Verreaux's eagle-owl based largely on their solid dark brown eyes, namely Fraser's (Ketupa poensis) and Shelley's eagle-owl (Ketupa shelleyi) as opposed to other eagle-owls which have yellow to orange irises. Fraser's and the likely conspecific Usambara eagle-owls also have a small amount of bare skin around their eyes but this tends to bluish in colour and is not nearly as extensive as the pink seen in Verreaux's. Evidently, subsequent genetic testing appeared to confirm the relationship of Verreaux's eagle-owls with the Fraser's and Shelley's eagle-owls. Other large owls native to Africa, the fishing owls, also have uniform dark brownish eyes and are sometimes included with the genus Bubo but are now generally treated as a divergent genus. Scotopelia based on genetics. Pliocene fossil Bubo owls with clear similarities based on osteological characteristics to the modern Verreaux's eagle-owl (most are currently classified as Ketupa cf. lactea) from South Africa and Tanzania, indicate that the Verreaux's eagle-owl descended from slightly smaller ancestors that increased in size as they diversified from related species.

== Description ==
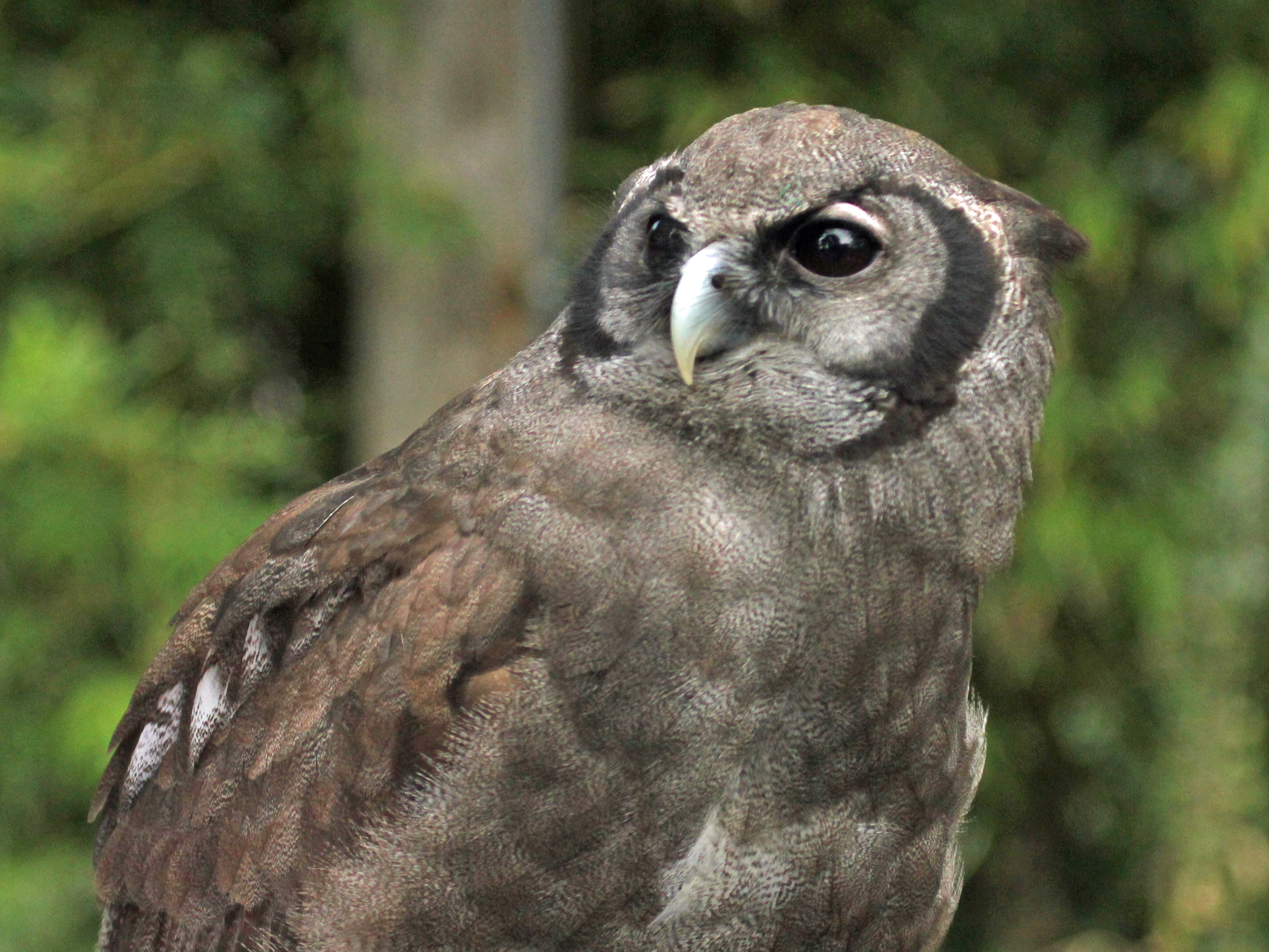
At San Diego Zoo

Despite the alternative common name of giant eagle-owl, Verreaux's eagle-owl is not the largest owl or eagle-owl in the world. It is, however, a very large and powerful owl species. This species is both the largest owl found in Africa and the world's largest owl to occur in the tropics. Among all the world's owls, it is the fourth heaviest living owl, after Blakiston's fish owl (Ketupa blakistoni), the Eurasian eagle-owl (Bubo bubo) and the tawny fish owl (Ketupa flavipes). In addition, it is the fourth longest extant owl (measured from the bill to the tip of the tail), after the great gray (Strix nebulosa), Blakiston's fish and Eurasian eagle-owls. Based on body mass and wing chord length, Verreaux's eagle-owl is about the same size as "medium-sized" races of Eurasian eagle-owl, such as those from Central Asian steppe (B. b. turcomanus) and the Himalayas (B. b. hemachalana), slightly smaller than most northern Eurasian races, considerably smaller than Siberian and Russian eagle-owls, and somewhat larger than the smallest Eurasian eagle-owl subspecies, such as those from the Iberian Peninsula (B. b. hispanus) and the Middle East (B. b. omissus or nikolskii).

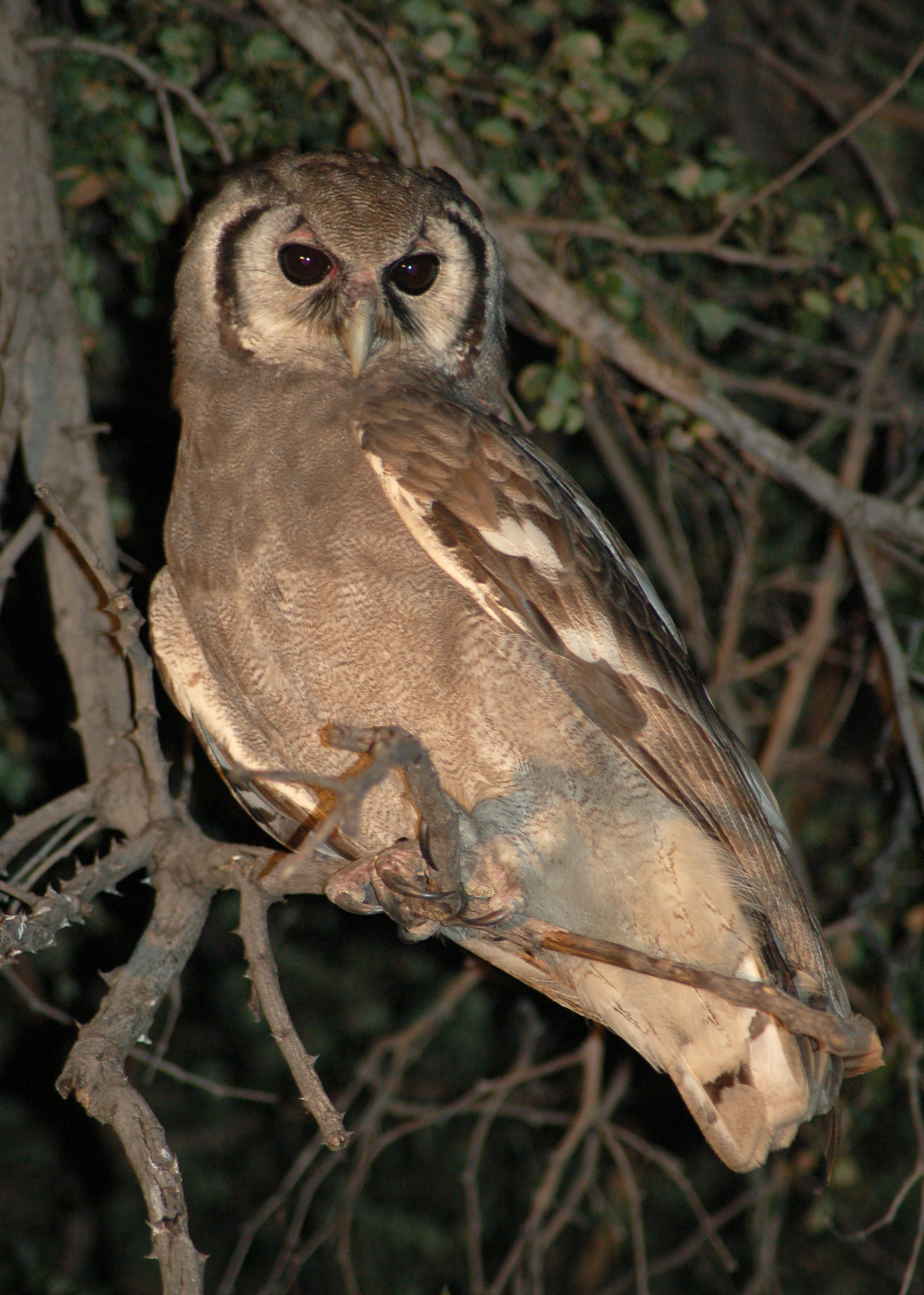
The Verreaux's eagle-owl's ear tufts can appear nearly absent.

Verreaux's eagle-owl ranges from 58 to 66 cm (23 to 26 in) in total length. This species has been reported as having an average wingspan of 140 cm (4 ft 7 in), but Mikkola referenced this as the wingspan of a smaller male. The largest known wingspan from a wild female measured nearly 164 cm (5 ft 5 in). While female owls are almost always larger than males, Verreaux's eagle-owl stands out as one of the most sexually dimorphic living owl species, some studies showing the female can average 35% heavier than the male. In comparison, the females of the nominate subspecies of Eurasian eagle-owls and great horned owl (Bubo virginianus) are reported to average approximately 20% and 25% heavier than the males, respectively. The full range of reported body mass in the species ranges from 1,615 to 2,000 g (3.6 to 4.4 lb) in males against a body mass of 2,475–3,150 g (5.5–6.9 lb) in females. In one study, 4 males were found to have averaged 1,704 g (3.8 lb) while 6 females averaged 2,625 g (5.8 lb). Another study found 5 males to have averaged approximately 1,700 g (3.7 lb) while five females averaged 2,300 g (5.1 lb). Unusually large sizes have been claimed in captivity with claims that specimens measuring up to 75 cm (30 in) in length and 200 cm (6 ft 7 in) in wingspan but these are unverified and possibly misreported as these figures match the largest Eurasian eagle-owls. Males heavier than any in the wild have been verified in captivity to weigh up to 2,200 g (4.9 lb). Among standard measurements, the female is reported to measure from 447 to 490 mm (17.6 to 19.3 in), averaging 465 mm (18.3 in), in wing chord, 230 to 273 mm (9.1 to 10.7 in) in the tail, while the same measurements in the male are from 420 to 490 mm (17 to 19 in), averaging 448 mm (17.6 in), and from 220 to 275 mm (8.7 to 10.8 in) in tail length. In both sexes, the tarsus has measured 73 to 86 mm (2.9 to 3.4 in) and the bill (in a small sample) 51 to 54 mm (2.0 to 2.1 in). Based on wing chord size compared to body mass and other linear dimensions, the Verreaux's eagle-owl averages somewhat larger in the size of its wings relative to its body size than most other eagle-owls, excluding the Asian fish owls which are also relatively long-winged.

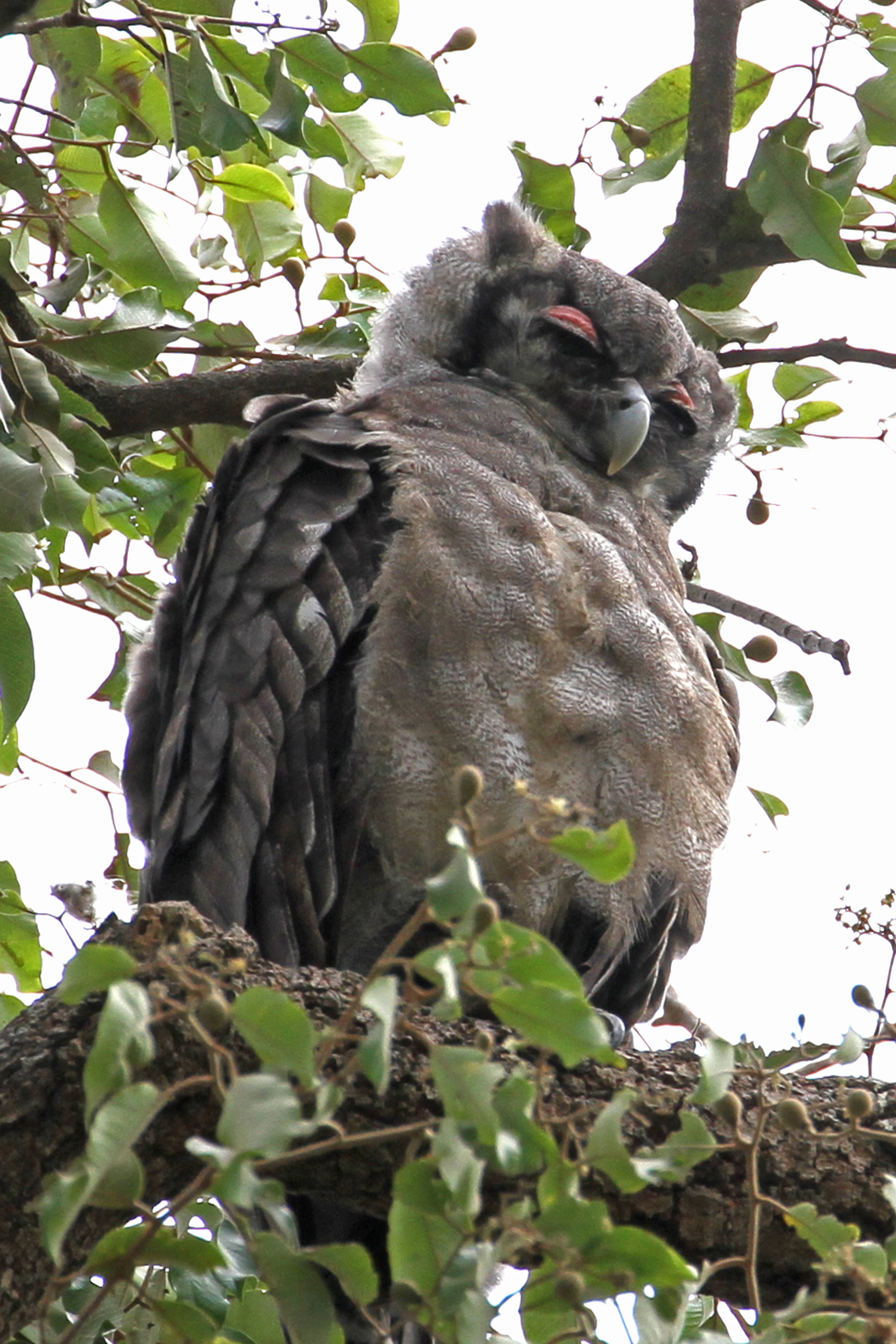
When a Verreaux's eagle-owl is resting, its pink eyelids are quite conspicuous.

Overall, Verreaux's eagle-owl is a fairly uniform and somewhat pale grey, with light and fine brownish vermiculations on the underside. The back is more solidly light brown with white spots on the shoulder. The oval facial disc is paler, sometimes ranging into a whitish colour, than the rest of the front side of the bird with strong black borders bracketing either side. One other feature that immediately distinguishes adult Verreaux's eagle-owls in good light are its pink eyelids. The ecological purpose of their colourful eyelids is not known; however, Brown (1965) opined that they replace the colorful yellow to orange eyes of eagle-owls in breeding and territorial displays, since they were very conspicuous in displaying males. Their eyes are dark-brown, and like all eagle-owls, they have ear-tufts. The ear-tufts are blunter and smaller relative to those of other African eagle-owls. The ear-tufts of this species are relatively subtle and can be missed in the field, especially if they are held lax. In appearance, they are quite easily distinguished if seen well. They are much bigger and bulkier than most other co-occurring owls. The only eagle-owl species in range that approaches its size is the Shelley's eagle-owl (Ketupa shelleyi), which may (but is not confirmed to) co-exist with the Verreaux's in northern Cameroon and the southern sliver of the Central African Republic most likely in forest edge and mosaics, but that species is a much darker sooty colour overall with broad black bands on the underside. Shelley's eagle-owl also has considerably different habitat preferences, preferring deep, primary forests, and is much more rarely observed in the wild.

The next largest owl in sub-Saharan Africa is the Cape eagle-owl (Bubo capensis). The individual home ranges, if not habitats, of the Verreaux's and Cape eagle-owls may abut in nearly every part of the latter's distribution. Even in its largest race (Mackinder's eagle-owl, B. c. mackinderi) the Cape eagle-owl is around 30% lighter in body mass on average than the Verreaux's eagle-owl, not to mention it being markedly different in almost all outward characteristics. Pel's fishing owl (Scotopelia peli), which occurs in west, central and inland southern Africa and may co-exist with the Verreaux's eagle-owl in much of its range (despite favoring wetland and riparian zones surrounded by wooded areas), can attain similar sizes as the Verreaux's eagle-owl but is dramatically different in colour (a rather brighter rufous-cinnamon hue) and lacks ear-tufts. In combination, the characteristics of their pink eyelids, dark eyes, relatively uniform plumage and extremely large size render the Verreaux's eagle-owl as nearly unmistakable.

=== Voice ===
The call of the Verreaux's eagle-owl is the deepest of any extant owl species and one of the deepest bird calls in the world, averaging slightly deeper than the calls of the Blakiston's and brown fish owls (Ketupu zeylonensis). The calls of Eurasian eagle-owls are less deep but are possibly louder and farther carrying. The male's song is an exceptionally deep gwok, gwok, gwonk-gwokwokwok gwokwokwok gwonk. The depth and quality of the song makes confusion by sound more likely with a leopard (Panthera pardus) than any other bird. The song is sometimes considered unmistakable. According to a study in Kenya, the voice is considered the second deepest bird call after the southern ground hornbill (Bucorvus leadbeateri), though that species has a fairly croaking call reminiscent of a large frog and in recordings appears to have a less sonorous call. Apparently, the song can carry up to 5 km (3.1 mi) away on quiet nights. The female's call is similar but higher pitched, as in all owls to some extent because the larger female tends to have a smaller syrinx. Like most Bubo owls, breeding pairs not infrequently call together but they are not as well-synchronized as the pair duets of spotted eagle-owls (Bubo africanus), which are often found in nearby ranges. The alarm calls of both sexes are often a sonorous whok or hook but variable grunting notes and raspy screams also seem to indicate alarm. Both the female and the young engage in high, piercing calls when begging for food at the nest, at which time the male does the food capture. One other vocalization recorded has included a raspy, drawn-out shrooooo-ooo-eh apparently uttered as a distraction display mainly by the male near the nest. While sound is important to some degree for inner-species relations and hunting behavior to all owl species, the Verreaux's eagle-owl appears to have relatively small and uncomplicated ear openings compared to several smaller types of owl. This indicates that the auditory senses are relatively unimportant in this species compared to vision.

== Distribution and habitat ==
Verreaux's eagle-owl is found through most of sub-Saharan Africa, though it is absent from most of the deep rainforests. The species is found at the highest densities in eastern and southern Africa. As this species avoids primary forests, it is found very spottily in west Africa. Their western distribution includes The Gambia, Senegal, Guinea and Sierra Leone. Eastward from those countries to the Central African Republic, the species is distributed in a narrow transitional zone between the Sahara and rainforests. Seemingly isolated populations occur in central Nigeria and central Mali. In south-western Africa, they range up to as far north as the southern parts of the Republic of the Congo and the Democratic Republic of the Congo, through most of Namibia (excluding the coastal regions) and northern South Africa. In east Africa, their distribution is more or less continuous from southern Sudan, Eritrea and inland Somalia down to South Africa as far as the region of the city of Durban.

This species inhabits mainly savanna with scattered trees and thorny vegetation. Verreaux's eagle-owls mainly inhabit rather dry regions, some bordering semi-arid areas. In central Mali, for example, near the extreme northwestern limit of the species range, the habitat that hosts these owls averages less than 55 cm (22 in) of rainfall annually. However, they tend to require trees for both nesting and hunting purposes so do not occur in completely open habitats or true desert. Some degree of ephemeral rain to allow tree growth and survival is presumably required. They also range into riverine forest adjacent to savanna and small, semi-open woodland surrounded by open country, though they are less likely to inhabit heavily wooded habitats. South African eagle-owls are not infrequently found around floodplains and marshes, which may provide the primary nesting habitat in some areas. In Uganda, they are largely associated with riparian woodlands. Verreaux's eagle-owl may live at nearly all elevations, from sea level to near the snow-line at around 3,000 m (9,800 ft) in elevation, such as in the Eastern Rift mountains. However, in general, they only sporadically inhabit rocky areas and so are generally very scarce in mountainous regions. The bushveld of southern Africa is near ideal habitat for Verreaux's eagle-owl and the species may be found at near peak numbers here. The species was historically rare to absent from the Kalahari Desert, but the introduction by man of invasive trees like conifers, eucalyptus and acacias, irrigation areas and prey species has allowed them to spottily occupy this region.

== Behavior ==
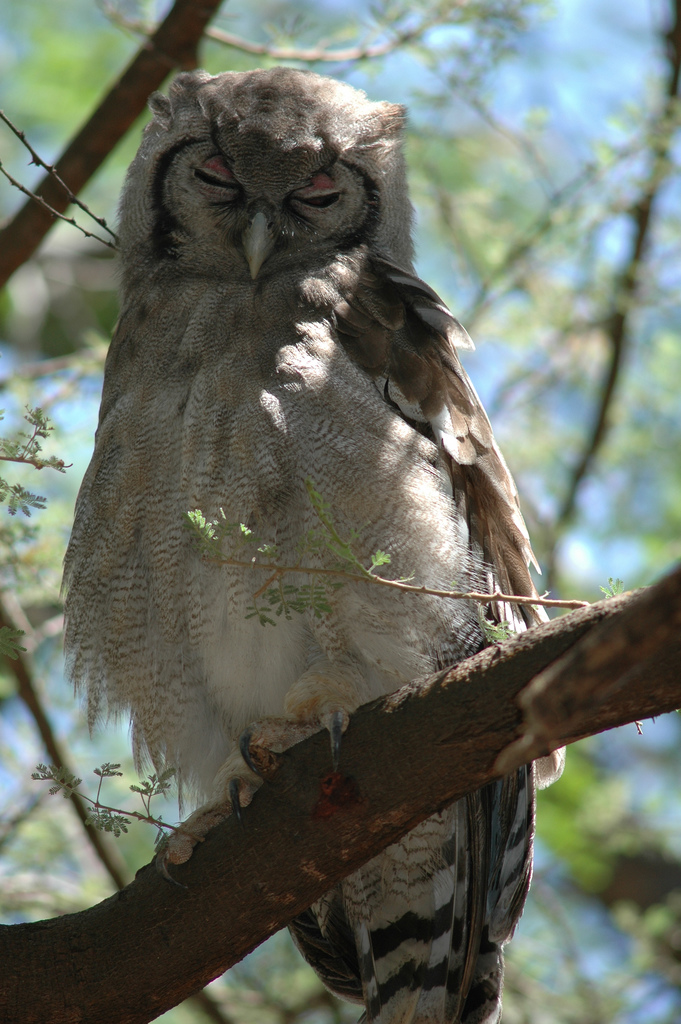
Verreaux's eagle-owls spend the daytime resting at a roost, which is almost always an ample tree branch.

Verreaux's eagle-owls are nocturnal birds and roost by day in trees, with a preference for large, shaded horizontal branches of tall, old trees. In Kenya, they are most likely to perch in Croton megalocarpus and invasive Eucalyptus; elsewhere, Acacia trees may be used habitually. Despite normally choosing dense foliage to rest in, they sometimes settle wherever their hunting path ends from the prior night, including relatively exposed perches. They reportedly sleep rather lightly and will awaken very quickly to defend themselves from attack in daylight hours. Family groups consisting of breeding pairs and their offspring frequently roost together and may engage in allopreening during this time. Reportedly some family groups include young eagle-owls that have hatched up to three years prior, which if accurate is exceptional for any type of owl species. During extremely hot days, the Verreaux's eagle-owl may flutter its throat for cooling purposes and has been known to bathe in rain and shallow water during extreme heat in the mid-afternoon, but it usually drinks when possible during the nighttime. Each breeding pair of Verreaux's eagle-owl defends a territory, and this may be extremely large, ranging in area up to 7,000 ha (17,000 acres).

== Food and feeding ==
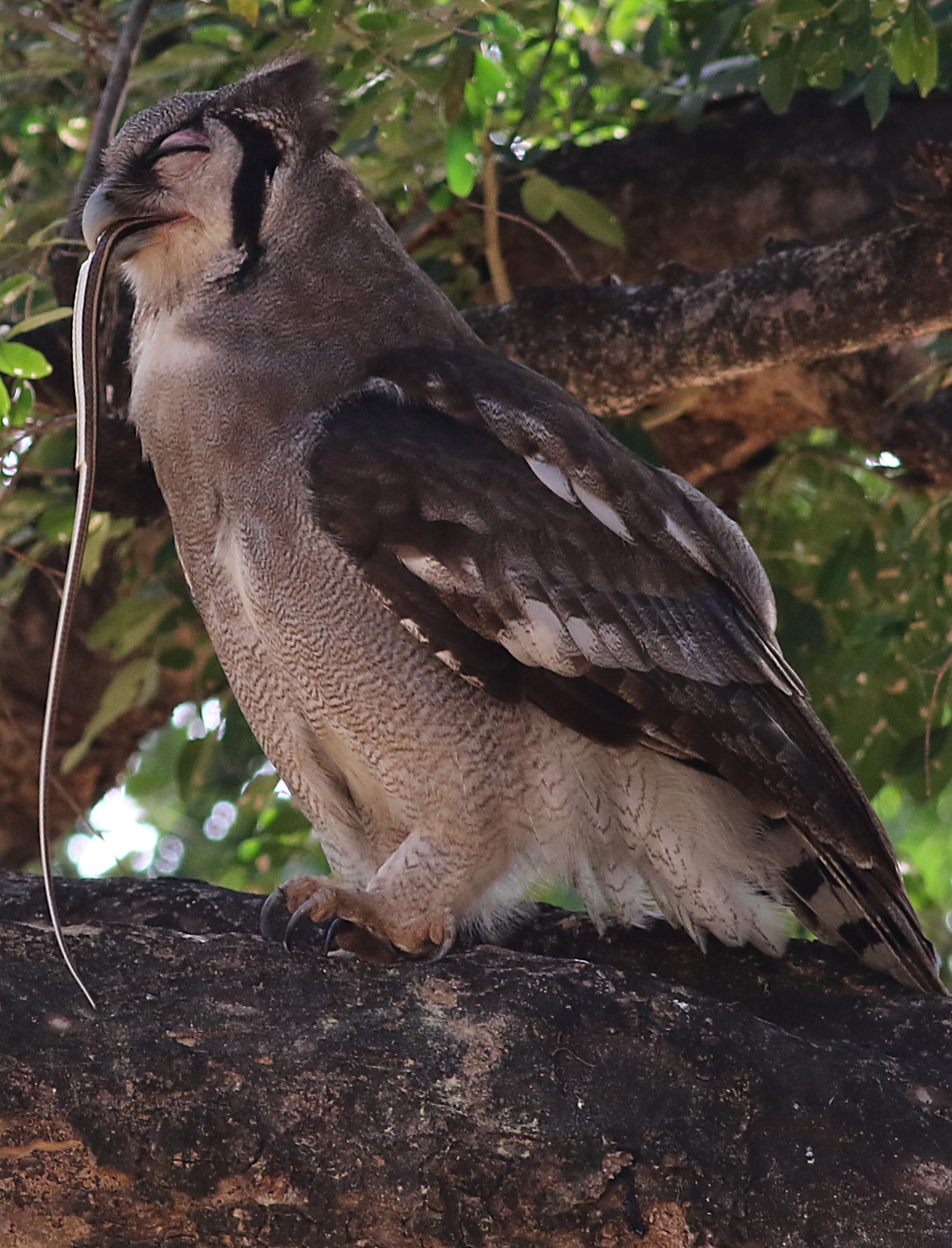
An eagle-owl in Kruger National Park swallowing a snake

Verreaux's eagle-owl is considered an avian apex predator, meaning it is at or near the top of the food chain and healthy adults normally have no natural predators. In many known aspects of its hunting behavior, it is typical of the members of the genus Bubo. This species hunts predominantly in early evening; however, they have been observed to swoop on prey during daylight. They usually fly to a different perch from their daytime roost to use as their habitual hunting perch. Verreaux's eagle-owls mainly hunt by gliding down on their prey from a perch. However, hunting on the wing has been reported, even of flying insects. On occasion, they hunt by flying low over a bush to catch prey by surprise or dash on the wing into dense foliage or through forests to catch a galago or other arboreal prey item. They will also sometimes run after prey on the ground, flapping their wings rapidly as they walk, or wade into shallow waters to pin down fish. The wing size of eagle-owls in general limits their flying speed and abilities in the open and so they require perches to execute most of their hunting behavior.

Even among the Bubo owls, most species of which are known to be highly opportunistic predators with indiscriminating diets, the Verreaux's eagle-owl is a particularly opportunistic predator. While earlier studies characterized great horned owl, one of the most well-studied members of the genus Bubo, as hunting whatever random species they first come across, more modern dietary studies have contrarily shown their prey selection is not completely random and that regionally they selected cottontails and hares as prey instead of other foods regardless of prey population trends and became regional specialists on such prey, to such an extent that it predictably causes owl population declines at times when leporid numbers decline. Furthermore, species-wide, great horned owls may select mammals as prey nearly 88% of the time. In contrast, studies have indicated that for the Verreaux's eagle-owl only around 56% of its diet is mammals and no single prey type predictably dominates their prey selection by biomass in multiple regions. To date, more than 100 prey species have been counted for this eagle-owl and, with only about half a dozen comprehensive dietary studies known to have been conducted, this probably only represents a small portion of the total prey selected. Estimated prey size for the species has ranged from insects weighing less than 5 g (0.18 oz) to ungulates weighing at least 10 kg (22 lb). This is the second broadest size range positively attributed to a single owl species for prey items after the Eurasian eagle-owl and the largest exceptional upper prey-size also after the Eurasian species.

=== Mammals ===
The prey type most often associated with Verreaux's eagle-owl are hedgehogs. It appears that this species is the only routine predator of hedgehogs in Africa, most other predators of small-to-medium-sized mammals choosing to pursue other abundant mammals without the hedgehog's prickly defenses. In both the southernmost, from the western cape of South Africa, and northernmost, a partial study of the foods at nests in central Mali, food studies for this species have found hedgehogs to be the most significant contributor of biomass in Verreaux's eagle-owl nests. The two known hedgehog prey species taken are the four-toed hedgehog (Atelerix albiventris), which averages 335 g (11.8 oz) in adults, in the north and the southern African hedgehog (Atelerix frontalis), which averages 350 g (12 oz) in adults, in the south. When capturing hedgehogs, the eagle-owl descends silently with its soft-comb wings and ambushes the hedgehog by imbedding its talons about the face. After death, the hedgehog is skinned of its prickly back before being consumed by either the eagle-owl itself or the young at the nest. This may result in over a dozen hedgehog skins being found around Verreaux's eagle-owl roosts near their nests. The same method of dealing with hedgehogs is utilized by the Eurasian eagle-owl, which is likewise reported as the only routine predator of hedgehogs in its native continent. Studies in other areas have shown that, while hedgehogs are seemingly taken opportunistically, they are at best secondary as contributors of prey both in quantity and biomass.

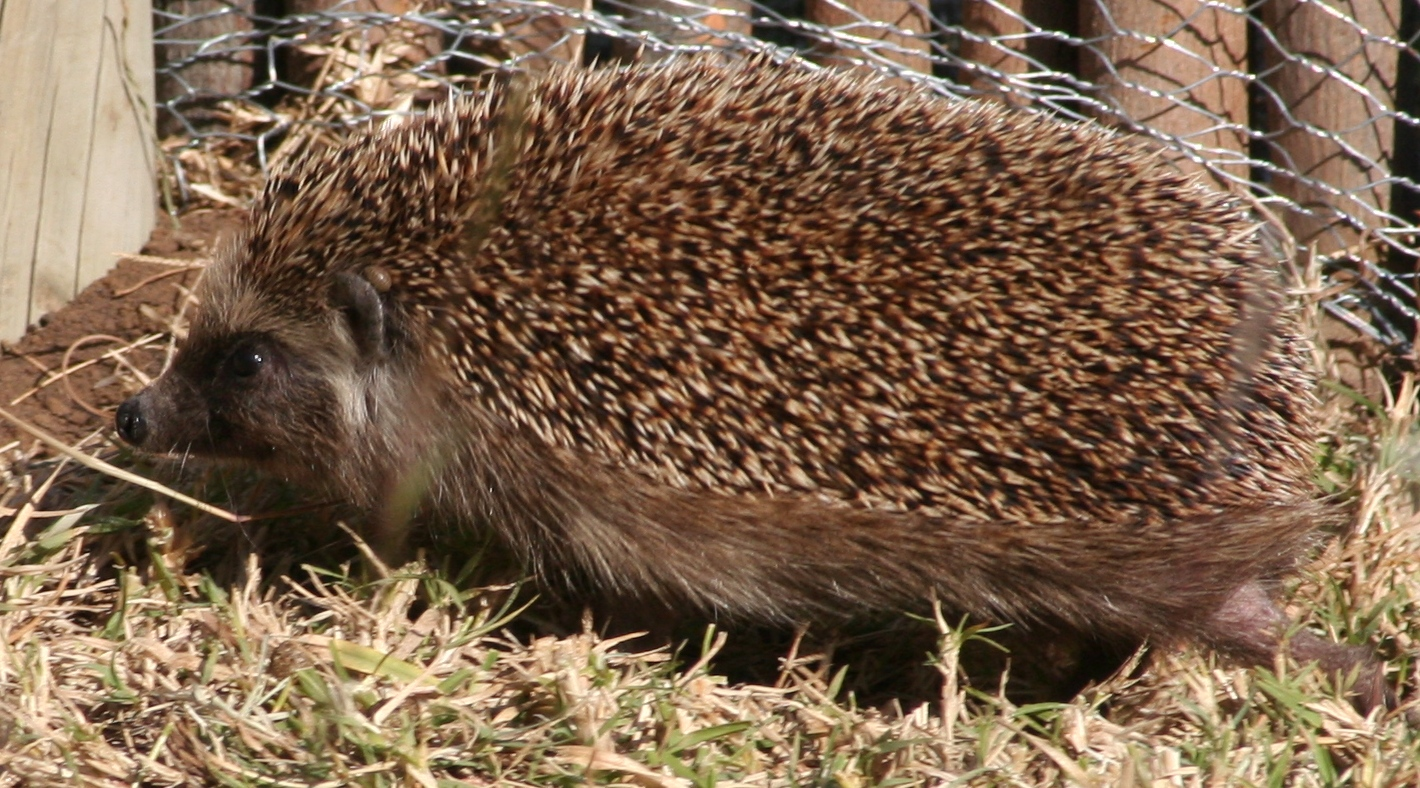
The southern African hedgehog is a common prey item for Verreaux's eagle-owls.

In general, the diet of Verreaux's eagle-owl is seemingly random and highly variable. Eagle-owl species from temperate zones may have no choice but to predate rodents which are rather small and this may require a nesting pair to capture up to a dozen rodents nightly. In comparison, the diversity and abundance of rodents is considerably greater in wild areas of sub-Saharan Africa and the Verreaux's eagle-owl seemingly ignores most small rodent species, with no rodent prey species known to average under 30 g (1.1 oz) in adult body mass. In Kenya, the most often recorded prey locally were Tachyoryctes mole-rats; however, these were recorded only slightly more often than other genera or species, including non-mammals. Several species of blesmol, a separate family also sometimes referred to as mole-rats, have also been recorded as prey. Several murid species have been hunted ranging in size from the 31 g (1.1 oz) southern multimammate mouse (Mastomys coucha) to the two non-native Rattus species, including the 360 g (13 oz) brown rat (Rattus norvegicus). Some larger rodents they've hunted have included the 529 g (1.2 lb) Cape ground squirrel (Xerus inauris), the 786 g (1.7 lb) Gambian pouched rat (Cricetomys qambianus) and the 1,900 g (4.2 lb) lesser cane rat (Thryonomys gregorianus). The largest known rodent prey is the South African springhare (Pedetes capensis) at an average adult weight of 3,040 g (6.7 lb). Avery, et al. (1985) opined that springhares may be only taken as carrion as they claim it be too large for the eagle-owl to overpower and indeed at least one South African springhare was fed on as roadkilled carrion. However, Avery, et al. (1985) also acknowledged that adult monkeys of larger size have verifiably been taken alive by the eagle-owls, so it certainly should not be ruled out that they also take live springhares.

Many other mammals taken as prey by Verreaux's eagle-owl are seemingly any encountered except the much larger species, especially those that show a propensity for nocturnal or crepuscular activity. This species has hunted bats in several cases from the 8.1 g (0.29 oz) Lander's horseshoe bat (Rhinolophus landeri), the smallest known vertebrate prey species known for this eagle-owl, to Rousettus fruit bats that weigh over 150 g (5.3 oz). Most other mammalian prey recorded or inferred as hunted by Verreaux's eagle-owl tend to be considerably larger. Both the scrub hare (Lepus saxatilis) and the Cape hare (Lepus capensis) have been reported as food, the scrub species estimated to average 2,740 g (6.0 lb) when taken. In parts of Kenya, the scrub hare can be a particularly significant contributor of biomass to the eagle-owl's diet. Other assorted mammalian prey species include the 540 g (1.2 lb) golden-rumped elephant shrew (Rhynchocyon chrysopygus) and the 3,800 g (8.4 lb) Cape hyrax (Procavia capensis), although it is possible that juvenile hyraxes are rather more commonly taken than adults.

So far as is known, Verreaux's eagle-owl is the only living owl that preys upon multiple species of primate, although isolated incidents of predation (normally on young primates) has been reported in two to three other large, tropical owls. Multiple cases of predation against galagos have been reported, unsurprisingly as they represent all nocturnal primates in Africa, although they are seldom identified to species. Known galago prey species have ranged from the 85.3 g (3.01 oz) Thomas's bushbaby (Galagoides thomasi) to the 1,098 g (2.4 lb) brown greater galago (Otolemur crassicaudatus). Monkeys are also predated opportunistically. Particularly often reported in foods of the Verreaux's eagle-owl as primates go is the vervet monkey (Chlorocebus pygerythrus). Incidents of successful predation have included vervets that were half-grown, which the eagle-owl was able to fly off with (despite being about as heavy as the eagle-owl itself), and an adult vervet of an estimated weight of 4,000 to 5,000 g (8.8 to 11.0 lb), which an eagle-owl took on the ground and subsequently dismembered. However, considering the formidable gauntlet of predators that vervet monkeys face, the Verreaux's eagle-owl is one of its more minor predators and attacks on them may be considered incidental, due in part to the monkey's primarily diurnal activities. Other monkey species believed to be occasionally vulnerable to attacks include the blue monkey (Cercopithecus mitis), which is similar in size to the vervet, patas monkeys (Erythrocebus patas) and the young of the chacma baboon (Papio ursinus). Adult patas monkeys, averaging some 8,633 g (19.0 lb), can be even larger than vervet monkeys but whether they take prime adults of the species is questionable.

There are a few verified cases of Verreaux's eagle-owls feeding on ungulates; however, some authors such as Avery, et al. (1985) feel that these generally represent cases of scavenging on carrion. The remains of an adult grysbok (Raphicerus melanotis), weighing an estimated 10,670 g (23.5 lb), was opined with certainty to have been taken as carrion per this study. Steyn (1982) accepted that this species could take live prey weighing up to 10,000 g (22.0 lb) on rare occasions; however, he stated in a case of an adult common duiker (Sylvicapra grimmia) being fed on by an eagle-owl that the duiker was likely roadkill. Scavenging on carrion is generally a rare behavior in owls and has been reported in only a few cases where large owls are exceptionally hungry. Live ungulates verified to have been hunted have included piglets of common warthogs (Phacochoerus africanus), which have an average birth weight of only 665 g (1.5 lb) but grow to over 2,000 g (4.4 lb) in just a couple of weeks. Adult Kirk's dik-diks (Madoqua kirkii), one of the smallest antelope species at an average of 4,590 g (10.1 lb) have also been hunted by Verreaux's eagle-owl.

Among mammalian carnivores the bulk of predatory incidents have reportedly involved mongooses. Common, social species from savanna-edge such as the 710 g (1.6 lb) yellow mongoose (Cynictis penicillata) and the 725 g (1.6 lb) meerkats (Suricata suricatta) have been attacked, as well as larger, shy forest dwellers such as the 2,500 g (5.5 lb) Jackson's mongoose (Bdeogale jacksoni). An adult Meller's mongoose (Rhynchogale melleri) weighing about 2,200 g (4.9 lb) which was taken by a Verreaux's eagle-owl on the wing represents the second heaviest known object successfully flown with this species after the aforementioned half-grown vervet monkey. Other smallish carnivores known to fall prey to Verreaux's eagle-owls include the 292 g (10.3 oz) African striped weasel (Poecilogale albinucha) and its larger cousin, the 817 g (1.8 lb) striped polecat (Ictonyx striatus), which in one nest from the border of the Kalahari represented the sole prey species for a pair of eagle-owls. In southern Africa, both the Cape genet (Genetta tigrina), averaging 1,732 g (3.8 lb), and the 1,600 g (3.5 lb) black-footed cat (Felis nigripes), the smallest felid in Africa, have been included amongst their prey. The Verreaux's eagle-owl is thought to be a threat to even larger carnivores, including the 4,150 g (9.1 lb) bat-eared fox (Otocyon megalotis) and the 10,000 g (22.0 lb) aardwolf (Proteles cristata), although whether healthy adults of the latter are in danger is doubtful. A scientifically-observed attack on an adult male African wildcat (Felis silvestris cafra), which can weigh more than about 4,500 g (9.9 lb), was aborted after the eagle-owl apparently deemed that the felid was too heavy to take flight with. However, domesticated cats of any size may fall prey to Verreaux's eagle-owl. At Lake Baringo Country Club in Kenya, this eagle-owl has apparently taken to habitually hunting outdoor cats, reportedly making the cats on the grounds highly skittish.

=== Birds ===
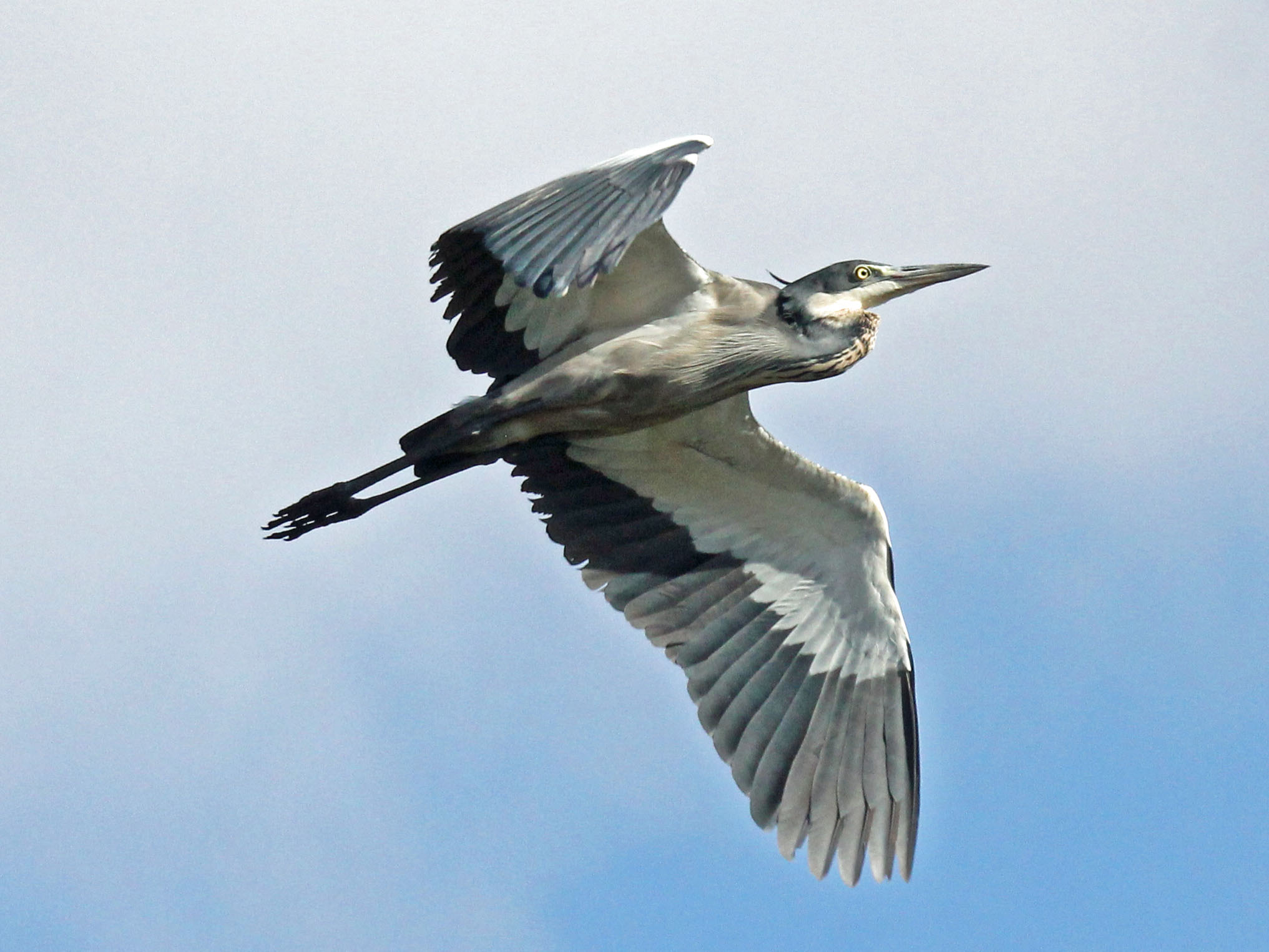
A South African study showed the black-headed heron as the most important prey by biomass for Verreaux's eagle-owls.

Verreaux's eagle-owl takes a diverse range of birds as prey. More than 50 avian prey species have been identified and they may locally exceed mammals in importance in the diet, somewhat unusually for eagle-owls. No one type of bird can be said to be predictably favored as prey and any avian species unfortunate enough to have a nighttime roost or nest that happens to be in an eagle-owl's foraging path may fall victim to this species. Many cases of predation involve nest robbery, with nestlings or fledglings being taken, although adult birds may be taken just as often, especially for species with less conspicuous nests. In South Africa's De Hoop Nature Reserve, it was found that birds were somewhat better represented by both number, 43.3% of remains, and biomass, 57.84% of remains, than mammals or any other prey group. The species best represented in biomass in the prior study was the black-headed heron (Ardea melanocephala) with several adults estimated to average 1,260 g (2.8 lb) being found among the prey remains. Other fairly common, largish herons are also known to fall prey at night to Verreaux's eagle-owl including the 873 g (1.9 lb) common egret (Ardea alba), the 1,443 g (3.2 lb) grey heron (Ardea cinerea) and the 975 g (2.1 lb) purple heron (Ardea purpurea).

Other medium-sized water birds known to have been represented in this species diet include the 1,008 g (2.2 lb) yellow-billed duck (Anas undulata), the 983 g (2.2 lb) African black duck (Anas sparsa), the 596 g (1.3 lb) African swamphen (Porphyrio madagascariensis) and the 825 g (1.8 lb) red-knobbed coot (Fulica cristata). Besides herons, another well-represented group of birds in the diet are galliforms. Perhaps the most widely preyed species reported from this group is the 1,229 g (2.7 lb) helmeted guineafowl (Numida meleagris), which may seasonally dominate the eagle-owl's food in Kenya. More modestly sized wild galliform species reported in the diet including the 96 g (3.4 oz) common quail (Coturnix coturnix) and the 390 g (14 oz) grey-winged francolin (Francolinus africanus). Domestic fowl, especially those allowed back to a semi-feral state and thus sleeping in the open as is prevalent in Africa, are taken when encountered, including chickens and peafowls.

Various upland birds recorded as prey include the 177 g (6.2 oz) Namaqua sandgrouse (Pterocles namaqua), the 350 g (12 oz) rock pigeon (Columba livia), the 84 g (3.0 oz) laughing dove (Streptopelia senegalensis), the 169 g (6.0 oz) Senegal coucal (Centropus senegalensis), the 49 g (1.7 oz) scaly-throated honeyguide (Indicator variegatus) and several species of hornbill, ranging in size from the 139 g (4.9 oz) northern red-billed hornbill (Tockus erythrorhynchus) to the 1,235 g (2.7 lb) silvery-cheeked hornbill (Bycanistes brevis). Among passerines, the most frequently taken are likely to be corvids, which are often favored by Bubo owls from around the world due to their large size, relatively open nests and frequently easy-to-find, communal nocturnal roosts. To date, the Cape crow (Corvus capensis) and pied crow (Corvus albus) are the corvids reported in dietary studies. In Ethiopia, thick-billed ravens (Corvus crassirostris), which at 1,500 g (3.3 lb) are possibly the heaviest corvid species in the world, mobbed them vigorously and seemed to consider them a primary threat. Smaller passerines are by no means ignored. White-eyes are among the more frequently taken smaller passerines, with the 10.9 g (0.38 oz) southern yellow white-eye (Zosterops anderssoni) being the smallest identified avian prey species, although penduline tits (Anthoscopus ssp.) are likely to be even smaller. The largest bird to be hunted by Verreaux's eagle-owl is complicated by the fact that they often take relatively small nestlings of larger species, such as ostriches (Struthio camelus) and grey crowned cranes (Balearica regulorum). The only avian prey items successfully attacked larger than other types of birds of prey (reviewed later) are likely bustards. Most predation records have reported on relatively small bustards, namely northern (Afrotis afraoides) and southern black korhaans (Afrotis afra), which average only 745 g (1.6 lb) and 690 g (1.5 lb), respectively. Larger species of bustard thought to be threatened by Verreaux's eagle-owl are the 4,790 g (10.6 lb) Denham's bustard (Neotis denhami) and the 8,430 g (18.6 lb) kori bustard (Ardeotis kori), although it is not clear whether adults (especially males) are attacked in the latter species.

=== Other prey ===
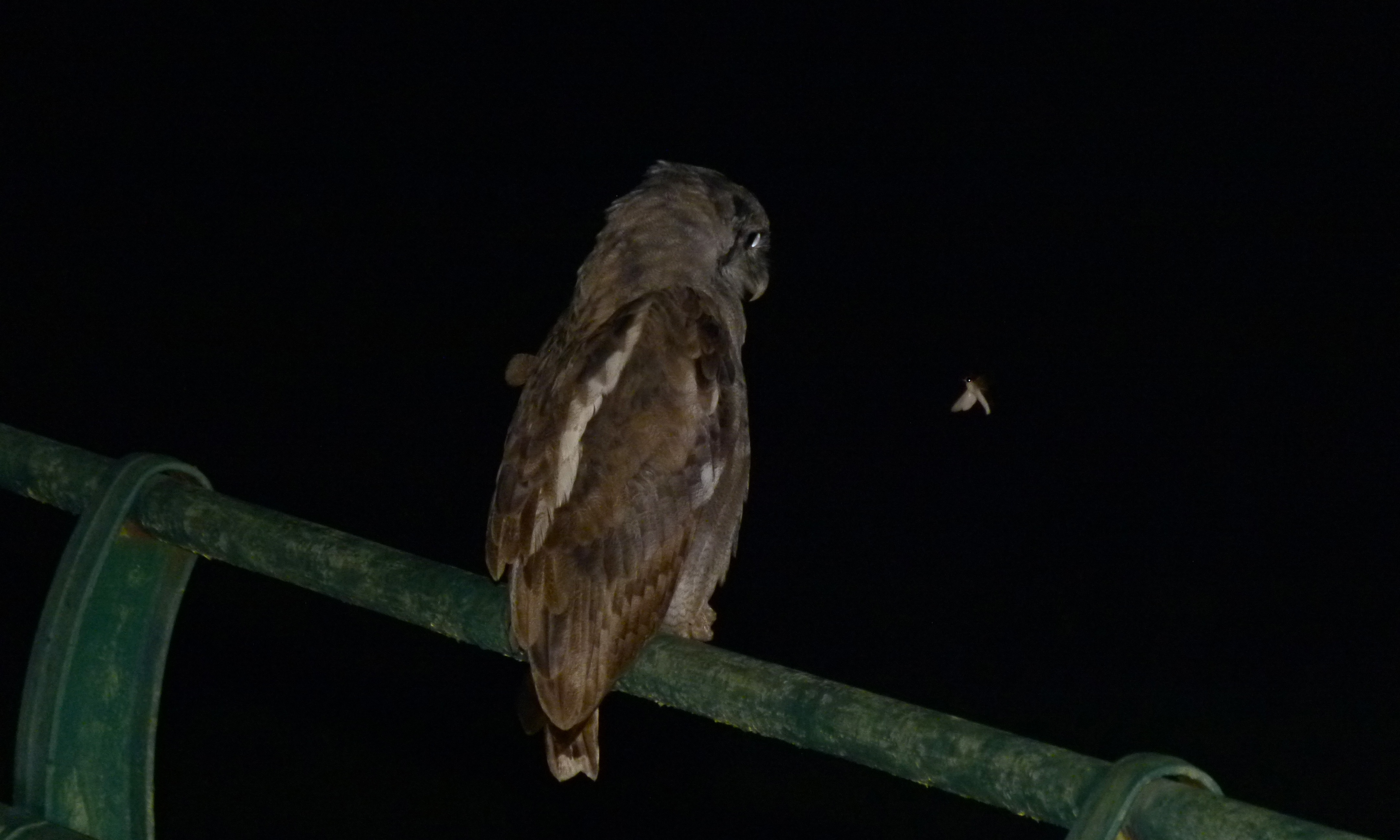
A Verreaux's eagle-owl near a flying moth, which can be as likely prey as a much larger item

Reptiles and amphibians are occasional prey for Verreaux's eagle-owls. Various snakes have been included in their diet ranging from the small, innocuous brown house snake (Boaedon fuliginosus) at 31 g (1.1 oz) to large and venomous Egyptian cobras (Naja haje) weighing over 454 g (1.0 lb). Frogs were amongst the prominent prey recorded for suburban-breeding eagle-owls in South Africa, namely the African red toad (Schismaderma carens) and the guttural toad (Amietophrynus gutturalis). Unidentified frogs were fairly significant in the diet from Kenya. The largest herpetological prey known is the Nile monitor (Varanus niloticus), at a mean mature mass of 5,850 g (12.9 lb), these primarily diurnal reptiles can provide a fulfilling meal but can be hard to subdue even if ambushed unaware.

Predation on fish has been reported but no fish have been observed firsthand in dietary studies. A surprisingly wide range of invertebrates have been reported in the diet for this species. In some cases, they may prey on insects as small as termites and even smaller invertebrates have been recorded in pellets such as oribatid mites and Sarcophaga flies, but are likely consumed incidentally while eating a larger item, either from carrion or the stomach of the prey itself. Unidentified scorpions, spiders and millipedes have also been reported in their foods. Most attacks on insects involve large ground beetles or dung beetles. Verreaux's eagle-owl has been known to feed on dung beetles among herds of African buffalo (Syncerus caffer) by night, boldly diving below the massive bovids' legs, and will readily feed on beetles among elephant dung when available.

=== Interspecies predatory relations ===
Sub-Saharan Africa has many species of owl, although there is less species diversity than in some areas of similar latitude in the neotropics and south Asia. It also hosts the most species of eagle-owl with approximately eight species of Bubo and Ketupa species collectively that are referred to as eagle-owl and all three fishing owl species as well. Due to the diversity here, there are a number of distinctions between habitat preference, primary prey types and body size among the so-called eagle-owls of Africa. The smallest species of the Ketupa genus reside solely in Africa, the akun eagle-owl (Ketupa leucosticta) as well as the smallest Bubo the greyish eagle-owl (Bubo cinerascens) and the spotted eagle-owl (Bubo africanus), in rough order of increasing size. These three species are all primarily insectivores and are much reduced in the size and strength of their feet and talons compared to most other contemporary species, although the spotted eagle-owl can be locally specialized to feed on small rodents as well. While the akun is a primary forest-dweller as are the medium-sized Fraser's and Usambara eagle-owl and large Shelley's eagle-owl and thus is not likely to co-exist with Verreaux's eagle-owls except in rare cases, the northerly-distributed greyish eagle-owl (which was at one point considered merely a subspecies of the spotted) and the southerly-distributed spotted eagle-owl have much more similar habitat preferences to the Verreaux's species. Of the non-piscivorous owls in Africa, the Cape eagle-owl can have a somewhat broad diet and a capability to take large prey but is more specialized to feed on a narrow range of mammals, mole-rats often supplemented with rock hyrax, than the Verreaux's eagle-owl. The Cape eagle-owl has a fairly strong preference for nesting and hunting within the confines of rocky and mountainous habitats, whereas the Verreaux's is at best sporadic in such areas. In east Africa and South Africa, habitat degradation has allowed the more adaptable Verreaux's eagle-owl to move into areas inhabited by Cape eagle-owls and has presented the possible issue of the Verreaux's competitively excluding the smaller species.

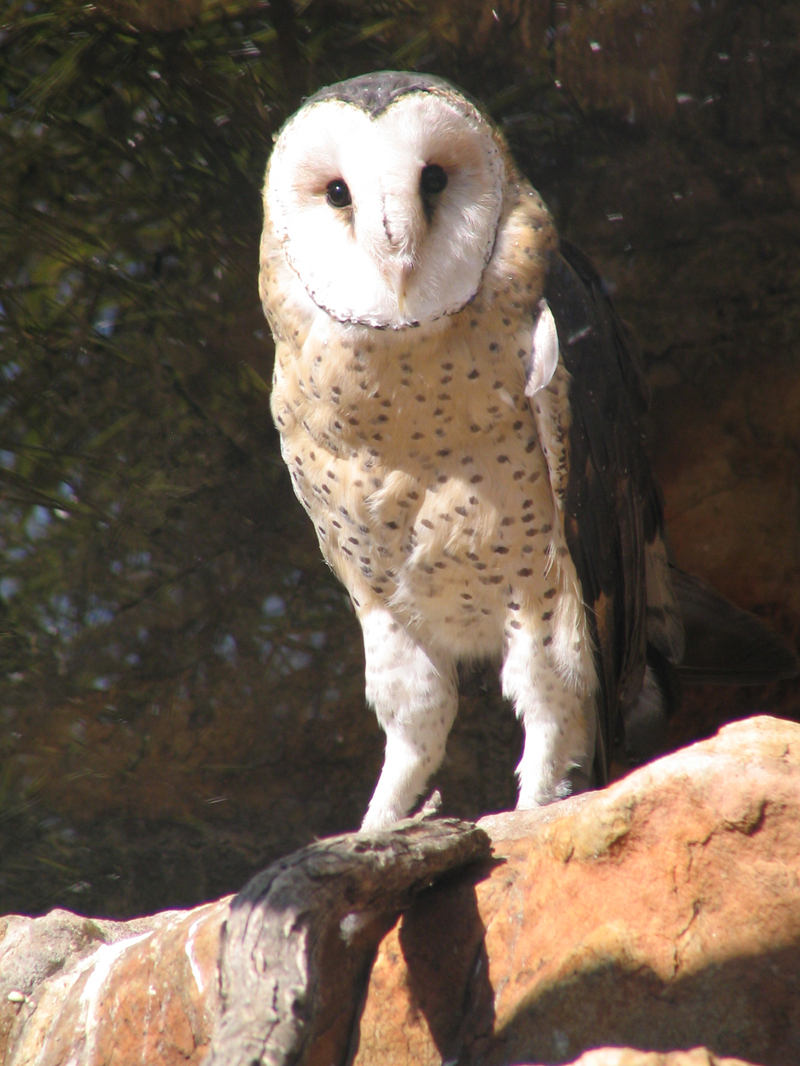
Other owls, such as the African grass owl, may fall victim to predation by Verreaux's eagle-owls.

Outside of the genus Bubo and the sister genera Ketupa and Scotopelia, other owls in Africa are much smaller than Verreaux's eagle-owls and are more likely to be viewed as prey than competition. Among the small-to-mid-sized owls that have fallen prey to this species are the barn owl (Tyto alba) and the African grass owl (Tyto capensis), both of which average around 419 g (14.8 oz) in body mass in Africa, the 334 g (11.8 oz) marsh owl (Asio capensis) and the 216 g (7.6 oz) southern white-faced owl (Ptilopsis granti). The only verified interactions with other typical eagle-owls have been predatory, as the 645 g (1.4 lb) spotted eagle-owl has been recorded among their prey in a few cases. There are several owls with broadly similar habitat preferences from African scops owls (Otus senegalensis) to African wood owls (Strix woodfordii) that have not been reported as food but are almost certainly occasionally threatened by Verreaux's eagle-owls. As is commonly the case with eagle-owls, the Verreaux's eagle-owl is perhaps the most serious predatory threat to diurnal raptors in its range, most often ambushing raptors on their prominent nests upon nightfall and freely killing birds of prey of any age from nestlings to adults. Such prey is not quantitatively significant as a food source but since raptors as a rule are sparsely distributed the habitual visitation of a single or pair of Verreaux's eagle-owl can potentially be devastating to a local population. Among the species of small-to-medium-sized raptors known to be attacked are the 638 g (1.4 lb) African harrier-hawk (Polyboroides typus), the 675 g (1.5 lb) pale chanting goshawk (Melierax canorus), the 507 g (1.1 lb) African marsh harrier (Circus ranivorus), the 110 g (3.9 oz) scissor-tailed kite (Chelictinia riocourii), the 291.5 g (0.6 lb) African goshawk (Accipiter tachiro) the 875 g (1.9 lb) common buzzard (Buteo buteo) and the 640 g (1.4 lb) Wahlberg's eagle (Hieraaetus wahlbergi).

There are reports of Verreaux's eagle-owls attacking even larger raptorial birds. A case of the Verreaux's eagle-owl killing an adult Pel's fishing owl in Botswana was verified. At roughly 2,000 g (4.4 lb) in body mass, the fishing owl is of nearly the same size as the eagle-owl. Cases where they've attacked the nests of particularly large diurnal birds of prey have sometimes involved only nestlings being victimized, such as attacks on the hooded vulture (Necrosyrtes monachus) and the bateleur (Terathopius ecaudatus); none of the adults, which are about the same average adult body mass as the Verreaux's eagle-owls, have been reported as prey. However, in some even larger birds of prey, adults as well as nestlings and fledglings have been killed. Successful nighttime attacks have been reported on adults of the 2,810 g (6.2 lb) African fish eagle (Haliaeetus vocifer) and the 4,017 g (8.9 lb) secretarybird (Sagittarius serpentarius). In the Matobo Hills of Zimbabwe, the Verreaux's eagle-owl has been considered as one of the inferred predators of 4,195 g (9.2 lb) Verreaux's eagle (Aquila verreauxii), although whether adults or only nestlings are vulnerable is not definitely clear.

Other than these rare cases, larger birds of prey such as eagles are not usually harassed by Verreaux's eagle-owl and are more aptly viewed as competitors. In fact, the martial eagle (Polemaetus bellicosus) is sometimes regarded as the diurnal ecological equivalent of the Verreaux's eagle-owl. The martial eagle has rather similar habitat preferences to the eagle-owl and has a similarly broad, opportunistic diet. At roughly 4,200 g (9.3 lb) in average body mass, the martial eagle is roughly twice as heavy as Verreaux's eagle-owl and takes correspondingly large prey, its average prey weight range being 1,000 to 5,000 g (2.2 to 11.0 lb) and the eagles are capable of exceptionally taking prey up to nearly nine times their own weight, whereas most of the eagle-owls prey does not exceed 1,000 to 1,500 g (2.2 to 3.3 lb). Verreaux's eagle-owl is likely to give martial eagles a respectful space during daytime and there are no records of the two species harassing one another. Another particularly large and aggressive eagle, the crowned eagle (Stephanoaetus coronatus), is largely a forest-dweller and so is less directly a diurnal equivalent. There is a single recorded instance of an immature crowned eagle being aggressively displaced at night by an adult Verreaux's eagle-owl when it happened to encroach on the eagle-owl's territory but without bloodshed and eagle-owls would do well to avoid the exceptionally powerful eagle. Taken together, the Verreaux's, the Shelley's and the Cape eagle-owls could be seen as nocturnally replacing the eagle species of martial, crowned and Verreaux's eagles in the respective habitats of savanna, forest and rocky areas but their increasingly diminishing size in comparison to the diurnal eagles means that, generally speaking, less large-bodied prey is likely to be attacked. Despite its place near the top of the nocturnal avian food chain, in 2013 a remote wildlife camera videotaped a black-backed jackal (Canis mesomelas) attacking and killing a Verreaux's eagle owl at a watering hole. Similar rare successful attacks on great horned owls and Eurasian eagle-owls by smaller red foxes (Vulpes vulpes) have been reported, but in these cases the horned owl was mysteriously grounded and the eagle-owl was nesting in too-easily accessed sea cliffs. More often foxes are prey rather than predators for northern Bubo owls. Given that the Verreaux's eagle-owl is surprisingly bold about coming to their ground to, among other things capture beetles, feed on prey too large to carry in flight or, as is likely the case in the jackal attack, drink water, it is possible that the jackal was simply able to ambush an incautious eagle-owl rather than a grounded one. Perhaps even more unexpectedly, an adult bateleur was filmed killing a Verreaux's eagle-owl by day, though whether this was predation or a competitive or anti-predatory attack is unclear.

== Breeding ==
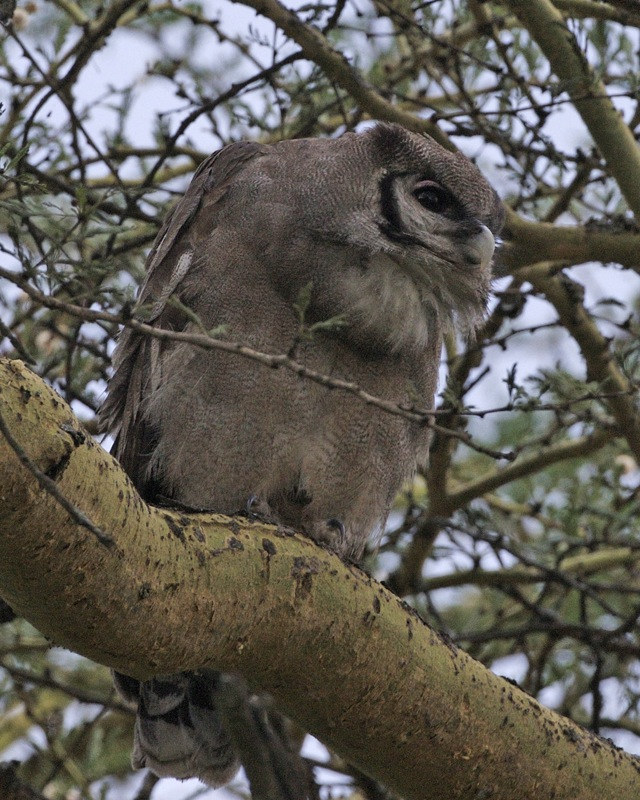
A Verreaux's eagle-owl is disturbed during the day; adult birds frequently defend their territory and nest at any time of the day or year.

In the heart of their distribution, i.e. east Africa, breeding activity in this species can peak any time from February to September, but can occur nearly any month at the species level. The timing of breeding is said to be correspondent roughly to the regional dry season, so averages earlier in the northern part of the range (before February) and later (July to September) in the southern part of the range such as Kenya and South Africa. In the northern part of the range, breeding season commenced in November in Mali, in November and December in Senegal, December in Equatorial Guinea and January in Nigeria. The monogamous pair is quite stable, most likely mating for life. As in most owls, a courtship display is both to establish mates for a newly mature pair of eagle-owls or to strength pair bonds prior to nesting. Vocalizations during courtship displays consist of relatively rapid and excited calling, hooting and whining. The pair during courtship will bow to one another, flick open their wings and preen each other's feathers, with the male taking the more active part in the courtship ritual. Like all raptorial birds, Verreaux's eagle-owls are strongly territorial. The pair will defend their territory by their song and sometimes (though rarely) through duets. The territories of Verreaux's eagle-owls can range up to 7,000 hectares in size, although average territory sizes are seemingly unknown.

Like great horned owls, but unlike Eurasian eagle-owls, the Verreaux's eagle-owls normally uses old nests built by other birds as their own nests. Usage of a nest site other than those constructed by other birds is considered rarer even than in the horned owl and is viewed as almost exceptional in some parts of this species range. Existent reports of this species building its own nest are certain to be dubious, as no known living owl builds a nest and only a small handful of owl species have been verified adding a small amount of nesting material to an existing surface or nest. The variety of bird nests they use is extreme. Large stick nests in sturdy trees are generally used. In southern Africa, recorded nest heights have ranged from 6 to 25 m (19 ft 8 in to 82 ft 0 in) off the ground. Like other Bubo owls, the large nest of large-bodied accipitrids are often popular for use, due to the often huge size and sturdiness of construction typical in this family, with the nest builders devoting up to four months to their construction. However, perhaps the constructor of nests that most often host Verreaux's eagle-owls are hamerkops (Scopus umbretta). Everywhere from Mali to South Africa, the eagle-owl has been recorded using old nests built by this species. The unusual, massive nest is an enclosed circle of sticks with a side entrance that are often very large relative to the size of the hamerkop, a smallish, compact wading bird. Usually the eagle-owls nest on the flat top of the hamerkop nest rather than the interior which is usually too small for the eagle-owls to enter and this can provide a rather safe structure for the eagle-owl family to call home.

Other nest builders which are popular as hosts are vultures, eagles (at least eight species have built nests used by these eagle-owls), secretarybirds, crows and even much smaller birds such as weavers, which build huge communal nest structures which the eagle-owls then similarly nest on top of. Most nests are already abandoned when the Verreaux's eagle-owl take over it, in large accipitrids for example, many build alternate nests which are not used for years on end. However, if the nest is occupied, the Verreaux's eagle-owl pair readily displaces the occupants and sometimes feeds on the birds in them. Species known to be successfully displaced from their nests have ranged up in size to lappet-faced vultures (Torgos tracheliotos), which are more than three times heavier on average than the Verreaux's eagle-owl. In some cases, hamerkops have been known to try to defend their nest from the eagle-owls but are usually chased away. Verreaux's eagle-owls have been known to displace other opportunistic nest usurpers such as other owls and falcons in order to take over nest structures for themselves. In one case, a pair of eagle-owls nested on top of a hamerkop nest while the interior of the nest was occupied by Egyptian geese (Alopochen aegyptiacus), an unusual aggressive species of waterfowl that uses nests built by other species. In rare cases, Verreaux's eagle-owls have been recorded using large, old hollows, the stem of a palm tree or on a very dense tangle of creepers or orchids instead of birds' nests as a nesting site.

On average, the female lays two white eggs, which typically measure 62.6 mm × 51.4 mm (2.46 in × 2.02 in), with a range in height of 58 to 66 mm (2.3 to 2.6 in) and a range in width of 48 to 54 mm (1.9 to 2.1 in). The eggs weigh from 93 to 101.6 g (3.28 to 3.58 oz), the upper weight being the mean mass of the first egg and the lower weight being the mean mass of the second egg. The eggs are reportedly laid at up to 7 day intervals and may take up nearly seven days as well between hatching. Most nest reportedly contain two eggs, but some may contain only one, and no more than two has been recorded in this species. The adult female incubates the eggs for 33 to 39 days, the incubation stage being slightly longer than those of most other eagle-owls, at least the more northern species. On average at hatching, the young weigh about 60 to 70 g (2.1 to 2.5 oz). The weight of the nestling can triple within five days after hatching. Due to the extreme interval between the hatching of the first and the second egg, the older owlet is always considerably larger than the second. As is widely reported in different kinds of raptorial birds, the smaller chick usually dies in the nest. This may be due to starvation upon being outcompeted for food by the older chick or the smaller chick may be being attacked and killed by its older sibling. Usually the smaller chick is gone within two weeks after hatching in this species. In rare cases, both chicks are reared and survive to leave the nest, although there are no known cases of two fledglings resulting from a Verreaux's eagle-owl nest in southern Africa. The young are covered in off-white down from hatching on and the pink eyelids may become apparent within the first week of life. By three weeks of age, the chicks down will thicken and darken to a greyish colour with some barring present. By six weeks, the young eagle-owl will start to somewhat resemble an adult, replete with the blackish brackets on the facial disc of the adult but still being fairly downy, particularly about the head. Only a week later, almost all the down is likely to be moulted.

The mother Verreaux's eagle-owl remains on the nest for nearly the entire incubation period while the male hunts for food for both of them. During the brooding stage, which lasts about 20 days after hatching, the female is still fed by the male, but resumes hunting thereafter. During the incubation and brooding stage, the male usually roosts near the nest during the day while the female continually sits about the nest. After the brooding stage, the female normally takes to a perch within a dozen or so meters of the nest. Both parents may use a favor perch near the nest at which they dismantle prey into pieces that can be more easily consumed by their young, these may be called "plucking" perches where birds are more commonly eaten or "peeling" perches where hedgehogs are the most regular prey. Most dietary studies for the species have been from researching the pellets and skins under such perches. The female is an extremely tight sitter both while incubating and brooding, and may not even be displaced from the nest even if shouted at or the tree is struck. When intruders approach too closely, including other eagle-owls, potential predators and humans, the most common response of the parent Verreaux's eagle-owl is to grunt lowly, often raising its ear-tufts and bill-clapping. Both sexes may engage in distraction displays when the area near the nest is encroached, but it usually the male and most displays occur during nighttime but are possible at any time of day or night. During such displays, the adult will fly over the ground with drooping wings, or alights and drags its wings and flaps about, often while bill-clacking and calling. Similar injury-feigning distraction displays have been recorded in the Eurasian eagle-owl and smaller owl species but are not known in most other Bubo species. In one case, feral dogs were successfully lured away from a young Verreaux's eagle-owl by its parents' distraction display after the young bird had fallen to the ground. In rare cases, the parent eagle-owls will attack interlopers. In one such case, a person who picked up a young eagle-owl on the ground was severely injured after both parents attacked him.

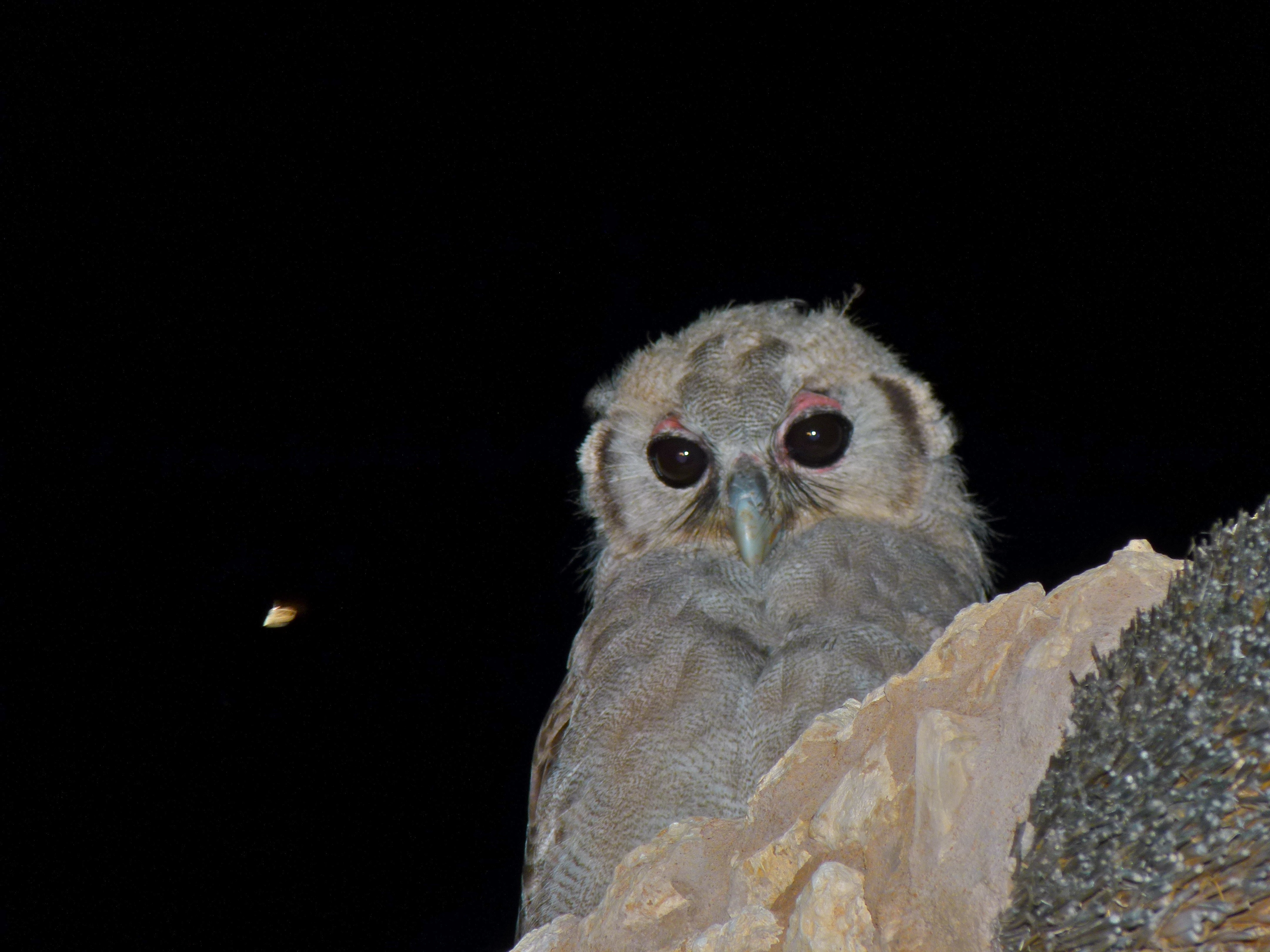
A Verreaux's eagle-owl "fledgling" such as this one often leaves the nest well before it can fly competently.

On average, the young Verreaux's eagle-owl leaves the nest at around 62–63 days but cannot fly at this point. It may take roughly anywhere from another two weeks to a month after this before the fledgling is a competent flier. After leaving the nest, the fledgling is "remarkably inactive", making a minimum of effort to fly, and usually selecting a roost within a few feet of the nest which it has awkwardly climbed to or will drop to a large bush below the nest. In the nest, the chick will beg for food with a shrill or chittering noise, sometimes bobbing its head or swaying about and transferring its weight between its feet (sometimes called a "hunger dance") and it continues to rely on its parents for food well after leaving the nest. Sometimes after leaving the nest, the young eagle-owls are mobbed as are adults by other birds of prey and crows during the day, which is often heatedly directed at this species as adult eagle-owls regularly kill these birds at night. The young eagle-owl may dodge to denser branches to avoid being wounded during such attacks. Young Verreaux's eagle-owls may fall to the ground, often as a result of mobbing. If the young bird is discovered on the ground, it may feign death, lying prone with its head lax and its eyes closed. Even if picked up while death-shamming, the young eagle-owl may remain moribund. Upon being left without disturbance after "playing dead", the young Verreaux's eagle-owl will gradually open its eyes and return to a normal state.

It is not until they are about 5 months old do most young Verreaux's eagle-owl show the ability to capture prey for themselves. However, the stage at which the young of this species becomes independent appears remarkably variable. One ringed 9-month-old moved 24 km (15 mi) away from its nest area and was thus seemingly fully independent. On the other hand, Verreaux's eagle-owls of over half-a-year in age who presumably can fly and hunt on their own have been seen to linger and continue to beg its parents to be fed into the next breeding season, and may even be fed by their father while he is also feeding the mother and a new nestling. In Kenya, when a biologist fed a wild juvenile eagle-owl mole-rats and chicken heads in its nest area, the young eagle-owl apparently became remarkably confiding towards the person. The tendency of young eagle-owls to linger into the next breeding season sometimes results in "family groups" roosting together, a very unusual occurrence for an eagle-owl species. One such group consisted of five birds together, including two parents and three owls from the preceding past three years and apparently the younger eagle-owls even helped bring food for the chick once the egg hatched.

On average, sexual maturity in Verreaux's eagle-owls appears to be attained at three to four years of age. In most cases, a pair of Verreaux's eagle-owl is able to nest annually; however, in some cases they may nest only every two to three years, in probable situations of extreme food shortages. Annual mortality appears to be fairly low in this large owl species. Few species have been reported to hunt Verreaux's eagle-owls short of the aforementioned jackal attack, even nests have rarely been seen to be predated, although they may on rare occasions run foul of some predators such as larger felids with the ability to climb. That young birds usually leave the nest before they can fly would appear to endanger them but the threat and distraction display of parent eagle-owls are apparently often successful. Adult eagle-owls can appear nearly fearless, as they have been reported to stand their ground and engage in threat displays when encountered on or near the ground against much larger animals such as rhinoceroses and lions, and in such cases are apparently not approached further by the bigger animals although the eagle-owls could easily be killed by such animals if contact was made. The lifespan in the wild is not known; however, in captivity the species can live for over 15 years, and possibly up to 30 years in some cases. In a Hungarian zoo (in Balatonederics) lives a specimen originally acquired in Tanzania in 1968, as of 2025, it is 57 years old.

== Status ==
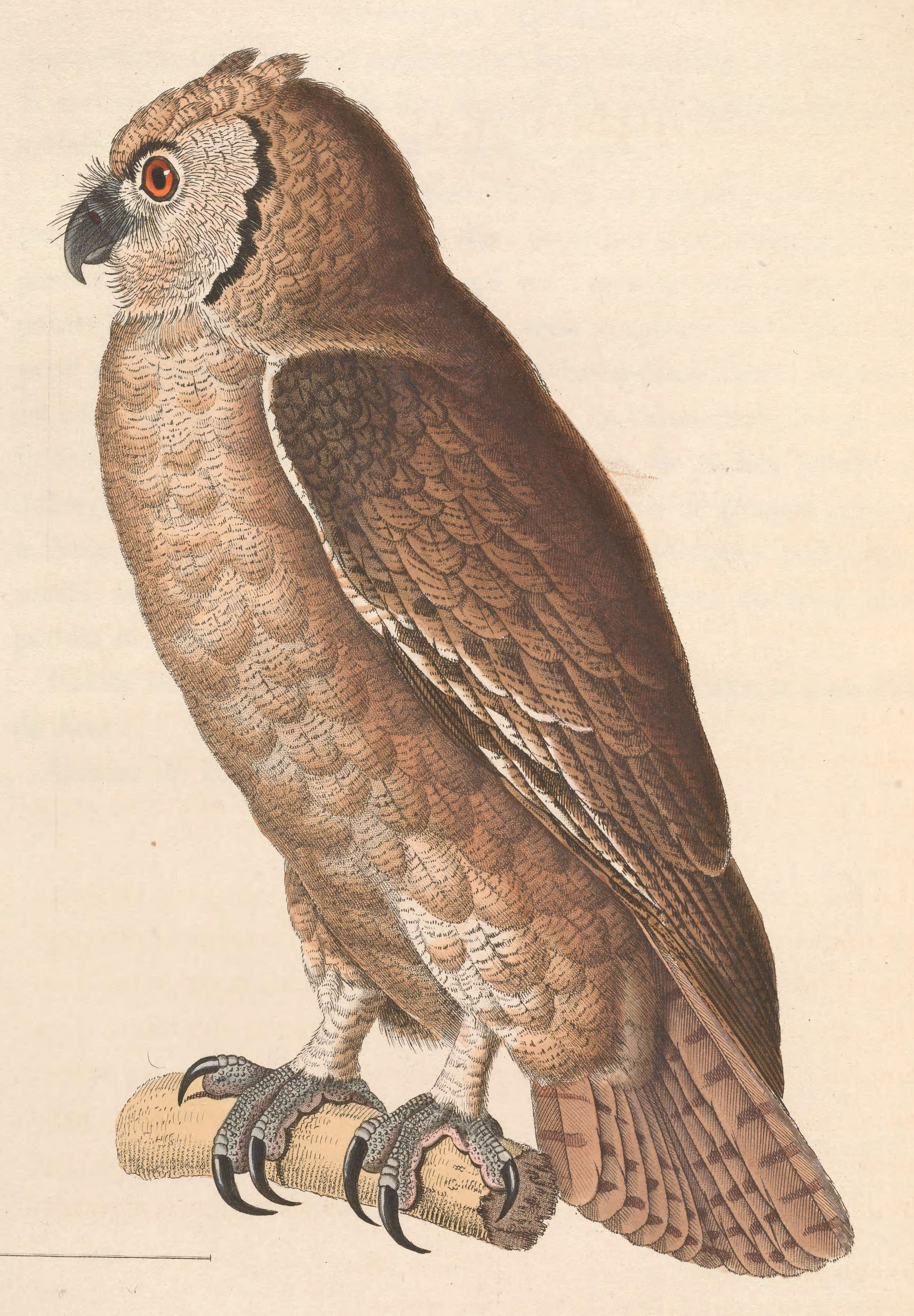
An artist's rendering of a Verreaux's eagle-owl from 1838

Verreaux's eagle-owl is a seldom-encountered species, occurring at low densities and needing large territories for hunting and breeding purposes. The threats faced by this species are sadly typical of many large birds of prey from around the world. Not infrequently, they are locally rare due to persecution. The normal cause of persecution is their possible status as predators of small domestic stock, though this is certain to be rare, at least in areas with substantial wild prey populations. An additional threat is the residual effects of pesticides, as poison (usually through rodenticide or poisoned carcasses left out for scavengers such as jackals) consumed through prey may badly affect them. They may be killed by flying into novel man-made objects, including wires and massive dams along reservoirs.

Habitat destruction can also affect them, as they require ample trees with large bird nests in order to take residence in a given area. In some areas, however, they've been shown to be able to nest in peri-urban or suburban areas, showing greater adaptability to human-based land changes than many other large birds of prey. In Eswatini, the species is considered Near Threatened and the species has been recommended for threatened status in southern Africa overall. In west Africa and central Africa, the habitat is often marginal for this species, the distribution is sporadic and thus this eagle-owl is only encountered either uncommonly or rarely. The greatest regional stronghold for Verreaux's eagle-owls is seemingly east Africa, in countries such as Kenya, which may have numbers comparable to pre-colonial times. At the species level, they are widespread and currently not considered to be threatened with extinction.
