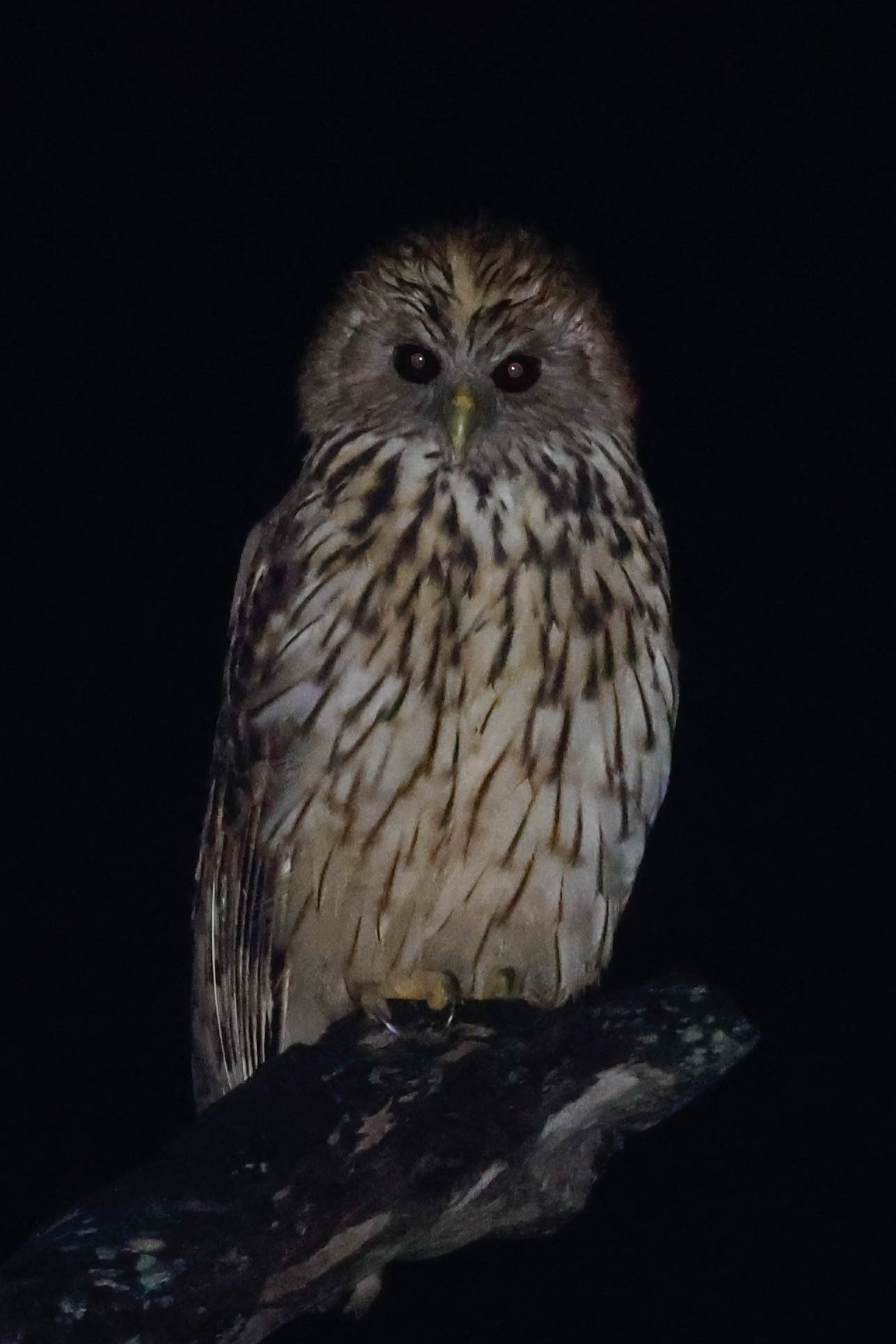

Conservation status
- Least Concern (IUCN 3.1)
- CITES Appendix II

Scientific classification
- Kingdom: Animalia
- Phylum: Chordata
- Class: Aves
- Order: Strigiformes
- Family: Strigidae
- Genus: Scotopelia
- Species: S. bouvieri

Binomial name
- Scotopelia bouvieri Sharpe, 1875

= Vermiculated fishing owl =

Species of owl

The vermiculated fishing owl (Scotopelia bouvieri, syn. Bubo bouvieri) is a species of owl in the family Strigidae. It is found within riverine forest in southern Nigeria and the Congolian rainforests. This species was first described by British zoologist Richard Bowdler Sharpe in 1875 and named in honour of French naturalist Eugène Louis Bouvier.

== Description ==
The vermiculated fishing owl is a large, earless owl with a total length of 46 to 51 cm (18 to 20 in). The facial disc is a pale reddish-brown with an inconspicuous darker brown rim. The eyes are dark brown and the bill yellowish-brown with a darker tip. The crown is streaked with dark brown. The upper parts are cinnamon-brown finely marked with dark brown vermiculations. Across the shoulders, the outer webs of the feathers are whitish making a pale horizontal streak. The flight feathers and the tail feathers are barred. The underparts are whitish, heavily marked with dark streaks. The underwing and undertail coverts and the thighs are whitish and unstreaked. The legs and feet are yellow and unfeathered.

== Distribution and habitat ==
The vermiculated fishing owl is endemic to a large area of tropical west-central Africa extending from southern Nigeria in the west to South Sudan in the east and northern Angola to the south. This bird is not migratory. Its habitat is gallery forests along rivers that are at least 10 m (33 ft) wide, and pools and flooded areas in forests; it sometimes occurs away from water.

== Behaviour ==
The vermiculated fishing owl is nocturnal and fishes from a perch on a low branch beside a large river, snatching fish from the water and also feeding on frogs, crabs, small mammals, and birds. In many places, crustaceans may be the most frequently eaten food. It roosts during the day in a tree near a river. In southern Nigeria its favourite food appears to be Clarias catfish which have primitive lungs and rise to the surface periodically to breathe.

Its voice is a low, croaking hoot, followed by four to eight staccato notes. A pair of owls often sing in duet, and being a fairly common species, several pairs of owls can sometimes be heard from the same locality.

Breeding takes place from May to at least October and possibly later. The courtship involves much vocal duetting and the nesting site may be a pre-existing large stick nest. Little is known of the bird's breeding biology, but is probably similar to that of Pel's fishing owl (Scotopelia peli). The young are slow to mature.

== Status ==
The vermiculated fishing owl has a very wide range in tropical west-central Africa amounting to a total area of about 3,333,000 km^{2} (1,287,000 sq mi). Within this range, the bird seems relatively common and the population trend stable, so the international Union for Conservation of Nature lists its conservation status as being of "least concern".
