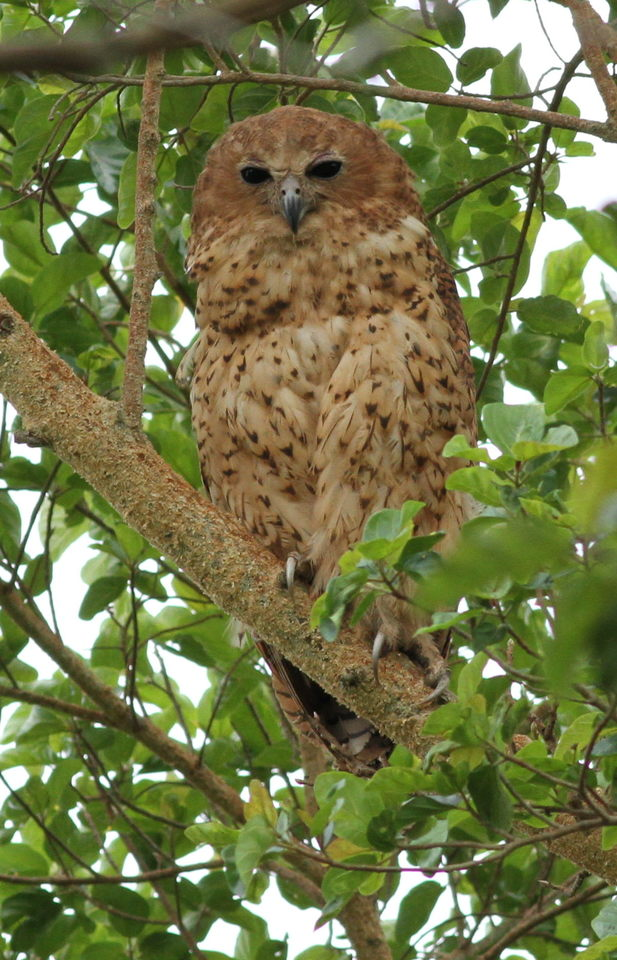
- Pel's fishing owl

Scientific classification
- Kingdom: Animalia
- Phylum: Chordata
- Class: Aves
- Order: Strigiformes
- Family: Strigidae
- Genus: Scotopelia; Bonaparte, 1850

Species
- See text

= Fishing owl =

Genus of birds

Fishing owls form the genus, Scotopelia, of sub-Saharan African birds in the family Strigidae, the true owls. The genus is closely related to the genus Ketupa, and may be embedded within it.

The genus contains three species:

Genus Scotopelia – Bonaparte, 1850 – three species
Common name	Scientific name and subspecies	Range	Size and ecology	IUCN status and estimated population
Vermiculated fishing owl	Scotopelia bouvieri Sharpe, 1875	Angola, Cameroon, Central African Republic, Republic of the Congo, Democratic Republic of the Congo, Gabon, and Nigeria.	Size: Habitat: Diet:	LC
Pel's fishing owl	Scotopelia peli Bonaparte, 1850	Nigeria, Senegal, the Gambia, Guinea, Sierra Leone, Zaire, South Sudan, Somalia, Kenya, and Tanzania and southwards to Zambia, Zimbabwe, Botswana, and eastern South Africa.	Size: Habitat: Diet:	LC
Rufous fishing owl	Scotopelia ussheri Sharpe, 1871	Ivory Coast, Ghana, Guinea, Liberia, and Sierra Leone,	Size: Habitat: Diet:	VU
