= Pel's fishing owl =

Conservation status
- Least Concern (IUCN 3.1)
- CITES Appendix II

Scientific classification
- Kingdom: Animalia
- Phylum: Chordata
- Class: Aves
- Order: Strigiformes
- Family: Strigidae
- Genus: Scotopelia
- Species: S. peli

Binomial name
- Scotopelia peli (Bonaparte, 1850)

Species of owl

Pel's fishing owl (Scotopelia peli) is a large species of owl in the family Strigidae, found in Africa. It lives near rivers and lakes, and feeds nocturnally on fish and frogs snatched from the surface of lakes and rivers. The species prefers slow-moving rivers with large, overhanging trees to roost in and forage from. It nests in hollows and the forks of large trees. Even though two eggs are laid, often only one chick is raised.

== Taxonomy ==
The species' common and specific name honours Hendrik Severinus Pel, who was governor of the Dutch Gold Coast (now Ghana) from 1840 till 1850.

== Description ==
Pel's fishing owl is one of the largest owl species in the world. Among the world's owls, it ranks as the fifth-heaviest on average, the seventh-longest in length and measured wing chord, and fourth-longest in mean wingspan, although not all large species have had measured wingspans. It measures 51–63 cm (20–25 in) in length, spans around 153 cm (60 in) across the wings and weighs up to at least 2.35 kg (5.2 lb). One male was found to weigh 1.72 kg (3.8 lb) and four females averaged 2.19 kg (4.8 lb), it may outrival the snowy owl (only around 4% lighter on average in six datasets) as the fifth- or sixth-heaviest living owl on average. Under current classification, it is the heaviest extant owl outside of the genus Bubo, although some authors may also include the fishing owls in Bubo. Among standard measurements, the wing chord is 40.7–44.7 cm (16.0–17.6 in) and the tail is 20.7–24.3 cm (8.1–9.6 in) long. They are well adapted to their aquatic lifestyle. Unlike most owls, they have minimal feathering on their toes and the tarsi, thus minimizing the amount of plumage that gets wet while fishing. Like diurnal raptors that specialize in fish, they have spiky scales on the bottoms of their feet that help them grip slippery fish. Since hearing and auditory stealth is not important to its hunting techniques, this owl does not have strong hearing and does not have the soft edges to its flight feathers that most owls share, which makes them almost impossible to hear in flight.

Adults are colored a rich ginger-rufous with dense dark bars to the upperparts and scaling to the underparts. The feathers around the head are loose and long, giving the head a shaggy appearance. The tarsi and toes are unfeathered and straw-colored. The white throat is often largely obscured, but can be puffed up in displaying birds during courtship. The flight and tail feathers are barred with lighter and darker feathers. The eyes are distinctly dark, often blackish in color. The two adult sexes are similar looking, but females are generally less rufous in color and have a more indistinct facial disc. Considerable variation exists in coloration and barring in adult birds, with some birds having extensive pale feathers with others having several blackish markings. Juveniles are more uniform buff than adults. Unlike the eagle-owls, the ear tufts of the Pel's fishing owl are barely visible, giving it a very round-headed appearance. The two related fishing owls are smaller and lack the dark barring and scaling (though they do have dark streaks below).

The song of the male Pel's fishing owl is a deep, sonorous, horn-like boom, first a single and then a higher pitched huhuhu. The male also utters a ringed hoot, much higher pitched than those of most eagle-owls, followed by a deep, soft grunt: whoommmm-wot or hooomm-hut. The calls of the male are repeated every 10 to 20 seconds and can be heard from up to 3 km (1.9 mi) away. While singing, the male's throat and breast are often highly inflated. The female's songs are similar, but are higher pitched and even in a double-note, i.e. hoot-oot. Females and young at the nest wail a shrill wheeoouu while anticipating food.

== Distribution and habitat ==
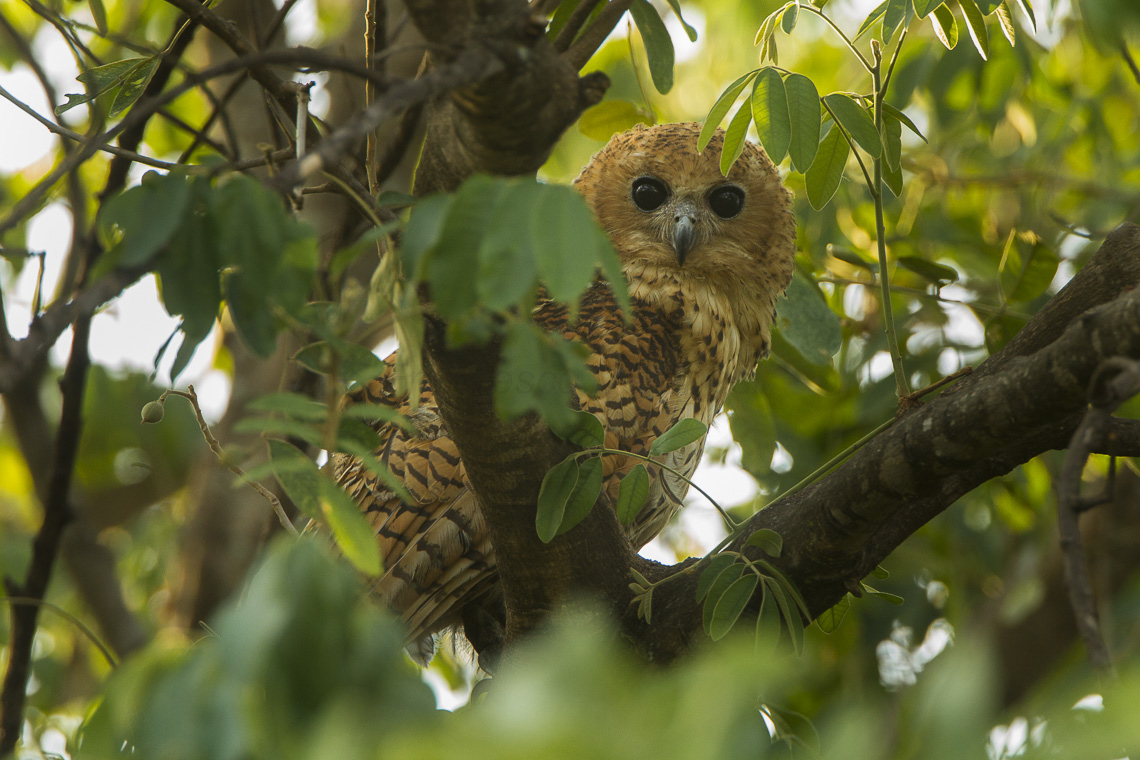
Pel's fishing owl in Malawi

It is found throughout a large part of sub-Saharan Africa, but it is generally rather local, uncommon, and absent from drier regions. It is patchily distributed in Nigeria, Senegal, the Gambia, Guinea, Sierra Leone, and in central Africa from the coast to eastern Zaire and discontinuously to South Sudan, Somalia, Kenya, and Tanzania and southwards to Zambia, Zimbabwe, Botswana, and eastern South Africa.

Pel's fishing owl is found in forests along rivers and lakes. It can be found in swamps and estuaries at sea level up to an elevation of around 1,700 m (5,600 ft). Its favorite habitat is riverine forests with large trees, although large numbers are also found on islands with large, old trees within larger rivers, swamps or lakes, so long as the islands are not too far from the bank. The species is largely residential and has no seasonal movement, although young, nonbreeding birds may wander somewhat before claiming their own territories. Pel's fishing owl may move outside of its own range in pursuit of prey.

== Behaviour ==
In general, this species is nocturnal and is most vocally active on moonlit nights, especially near dawn. However, they are sometimes seen to be active during the day, especially when prey is scarce. During the daytime, they usually roost on a large tree branch. Often, the male and female roost together. At dusk, they leave the roost and instead perch on stumps, branches, and other objects that extend over the water.

=== Diet and feeding ===
The main prey of Pel's fishing owls is fish. They can take fish weighing as much as 2 kg (4.4 lb), but most fish caught are much smaller, usually weighing 100–200 g (3.5–7.1 oz). They are not picky eaters among fish species and any fish that is in a reasonable size range and found close to the water's surface is readily caught and consumed. Compared with the fish owls in the genus Bubo, the three fishing owls are more completely piscivorous and rarely vary their prey selection from fish. They may also take other aquatic animals such as frogs, crabs, mussels and large insects. In one case, a Pel's fishing owl was observed to prey on a baby Nile crocodile (Crocodylus niloticus). While perched over the water, these owls detect the movement of fish from ripples in the water and swoop down to seize their prey with their powerful talons and then swoop back to their perch for consumption. Unlike many other fish-eating birds, Pel's fishing owls rarely submerge themselves or get particularly wet while hunting. More uncommonly, this species forages by wading into shallow water along sandbanks.

=== Breeding ===
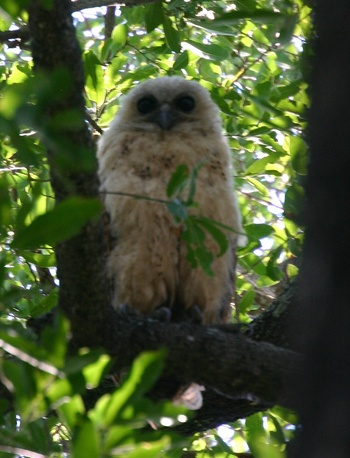
A young bird near fledging age in Botswana

Pel's fishing owls nest during the dry season, which has the benefit of lower, clearer water, thus more easily detectable fish. They are monogamous and territorial, claiming a stretch of river or lakeshore for themselves. All activity in the species occurs within striking distance of water. Territories are claimed by hooting at the start of the breeding season. When prey selection is good, populations can be quite dense. At such bountiful times, territories are often quite small with the central activity of breeding pairs sometimes occurring within 300 m (980 ft) of each other. In Botswana, 23 territories were found along 60 km of river, and in Kruger National Park, up to eight pairs can be found in an 18 km stretch of the Levubu River.

The nest is a natural hollow or cavity in an old, shady tree close to the water, quite often around where thick branches emerge from the trunk. The clutch size is typically one or two eggs, which average 62.5 mm × 52.1 mm (2.46 in × 2.05 in) in length and weigh around 85 g (3.0 oz). The female lays the eggs when water is at its peak or starting to fall, so that brood feeding coincides with low water and concentrated prey. The female does all incubation for around 32 days, while the male feeds her. If more than one egg is in the nest, hatching occurs at 5-day intervals. The second chick often disappears, probably due to starvation. At hatching, the chick weighs 60–70 g (2.1–2.5 oz), with their eyes opening 7 days later. Within 20 days, their weight increases to around 500 g (1.1 lb) and then balloons to around 1,400–1,700 g (3.1–3.7 lb) by the time they are 68 to 70 days old. The young remain in their parents' territory for 6 to 9 months after fledging and resemble the adult by around 10 months of age. At the first sight of danger to their offspring, both parents may engage in distraction displays. These consists of behaving as if injured, to draw the attention of potential predators, and penetrating screeches. Pel's fishing owls may attack African fish eagles (Haliaeetus vocifer) that come too close to their nests. The fish eagles and Verreaux's eagle-owls (Bubo lacteus) are perhaps the only predatory threat to this species, though encounters between the two large owls are likely very rare due to significantly different habitat preferences. Due to the relatively late stage at which the young become fully independent, Pel's fishing owls usually only breed in alternate years.

== Status ==
Pel's fishing owl ranges from locally rare and sporadic to quite common, depending on how ideal the local environment is. Due to the dependence on large waterways with abundant fish and mature trees, they are highly sensitive to destruction of their habitat. Damming rivers, siltification, and removal of water for irrigation may be local issues faced by the species. In some places, water pollution may pose a further problem, and overfishing, particularly where human populations are rapidly increasing, can also deplete the owl's food supplies. Changes in water supply can have knock-on effects on the riverine forest in which Pel's fishing owls roost and nest, and in some areas this habitat is being further degraded by wood-cutting and even by tree damage by large elephant populations. Even where the species occurs in protected areas, human activities upstream can still impact fish stocks and nesting trees. Overall, the species is widely distributed and populations currently appear to be stable. Thus, the species is classified as least concern by the IUCN. The species may come under pressure in Namibia in the future if, as predicted by climate change models, Namibia becomes drier and the growing human population increasingly relies on and impacts the region's river systems.
