= ERAM =

ERAM or eRAM or Eram may refer to:

== Places ==
- Eram, Oklahoma, a populated location in Okmulgee County, Oklahoma in the United States
- Eram, Odisha, India; where the 1942 Eram massacre occurred

=== Iran ===
- Eram, Mahmudabad, a village in Mazandaran Province, Iran
- Eram, Neka, a village in Mazandaran Province, Iran
- Eram District, Dashtestan, Bushehr, Iran
  - Eram Rural District, Dashtestan, Bushehr, Iran
- Eram Amusement Park, Tehran, Iran
- Eram Zoo, Tehran, Iran
- Eram Garden, a botanical garden in Shiraz, Iran

== Arts, entertainment, media ==
- Eeram, a 2009 Indian film
- ERAM, a song in Deltarune Chapter 3
  - By extension, the "Shadow Mantle Holder," an enemy in Deltarune.

== Other uses ==
- En Route Automation Modernization
- Eram Air, Iranian airline
- SM-6 Standard ERAM, a U.S. missile
- Extended Range Attack Munition, a U.S. air-launched stand-off munition
- Electronic Research Archive for Mathematics
- eRAM, embedded random-access memory
- ERAM, an open source RAM disk software

== See also ==
- ERAMS, a form of electronic library service
- RAM (disambiguation)
