= Tigers Between Empires =

2025 non-fiction book by Jonathan Slaght

- Author: Jonathan Slaght
- Genre: Non-fiction
- Publisher: Allen Lane (UK); Farrar, Straus, and Giroux (US)
- Publication date: November 4, 2025
- Pages: 512
- ISBN: 978-0-374-61098-2

Tigers Between Empires: The Improbable Return of Great Cats to the Forests of Russia and China is a 2025 non-fiction book by American writer and conservation biologist Jonathan Slaght. It was published by Allen Lane in the United Kingdom and Farrar, Straus and Giroux in the United States.

The book recounts the history of conservation work to save the Siberian tiger, especially the Siberian Tiger Introduction Project.

It has received positive reviews from critics. It was named a Best Book of 2025 by the Minnesota Star Tribune, The Telegraph (UK), BookPage, and CounterPunch. Michaela Thurman of The Minnesota Star Tribune praised its personal insight and political analysis. A review in Publishers Weekly wrote that "Slaght brings their stories to life on the page with vivid detail and suspense." Kirkus Reviews called the book "a well-crafted story of a successful conservation effort, against all the odds." Writer Colin Thubron said the book "reads not as an encomium but a balanced, lucid, and intimately knowledgeable record."
