= Jonathan Slaght =

American writer and conservation biologist

Jonathan C. Slaght is an American writer and conservation biologist who studies endangered species of northeast Asia.

== Early life and education ==
Slaght went to George School, graduating in 1994. He got his B.A. from Drew University where he studied the Russian language. He served in the Peace Corps in Primorye for three years. He earned an MS (2005) in Conservation Biology and a PhD in Wildlife Conservation (2011) from the University of Minnesota. He lives in South Minneapolis.

== Career ==
Slaght is the regional director of the Wildlife Conservation Society's Temperate Asia Program where he oversees programs and projects in China, Mongolia, Afghanistan, Russia and Central Asia. He has worked there since 2011.

== Books ==
Slaght has written two books about conservation biology and fieldwork: Owls of the Eastern Ice (2020) and Tigers Between Empires (2025), both published by Farrar, Straus, and Giroux.

His first book describes his four years of fieldwork in the forests of Primorye studying Blakiston's fish owl drawing largely from his field notes taken while working on his PhD. Helen Macdonald called it "a wonderful guide to the reality of fieldwork." The book was named The Times Nature Book of the Year in 2020, and received the PEN/E. O. Wilson Literary Science Writing Award in 2021 as well as the Minnesota Book Award in 2021, and was nominated for a National Book Award in 2020. He was inducted into the World Owl Hall of Fame in 2017.

His second book, Tigers Between Empires, highlights thirty years of conservation projects centered around the Siberian tiger. Kirkus Reviews described it "as much about human history as it is about wild cats." Slaght was in the area during his time in the Peace Corps and met the tiger conservationists while he was there, occasionally assisting with their fieldwork. The book highlights the cooperation between Russian and US conservationists working together on the launch and maintenance of the Siberian Tiger Project. It was named one of the Best Books of 2025 by the Minnesota Star Tribune, BookPage, and CounterPunch.

Slaght has also translated books by other writers. He published and annotated a translation of Vladimir Arsenyev's book Across the Ussuri Kray (2016, Indiana University Press), a book which was inspirational for him. He also co-translated Winter Ecology of the Amur Tiger which was written by A. G. Yudakov and I. G. Nikolaev.

== Book Reviews ==
Slaght has reviewed books for both The New York Times and The Atlantic, including Suzanne Simard's Finding The Mother Tree, Ben Goldfarb's Crossings, and Adam Weymouth's Lone Wolf.

== Other Writings ==
His other writings have appeared in The New York Times, The Guardian, Orion Magazine, and Scientific American where he was a columnist.
