= Blakiston's fish owl =

Conservation status
- Vulnerable (IUCN 3.1)
- CITES Appendix II

Scientific classification
- Kingdom: Animalia
- Phylum: Chordata
- Class: Aves
- Order: Strigiformes
- Family: Strigidae
- Genus: Ketupa
- Species: K. blakistoni

Binomial name
- Ketupa blakistoni (Seebohm, 1884)
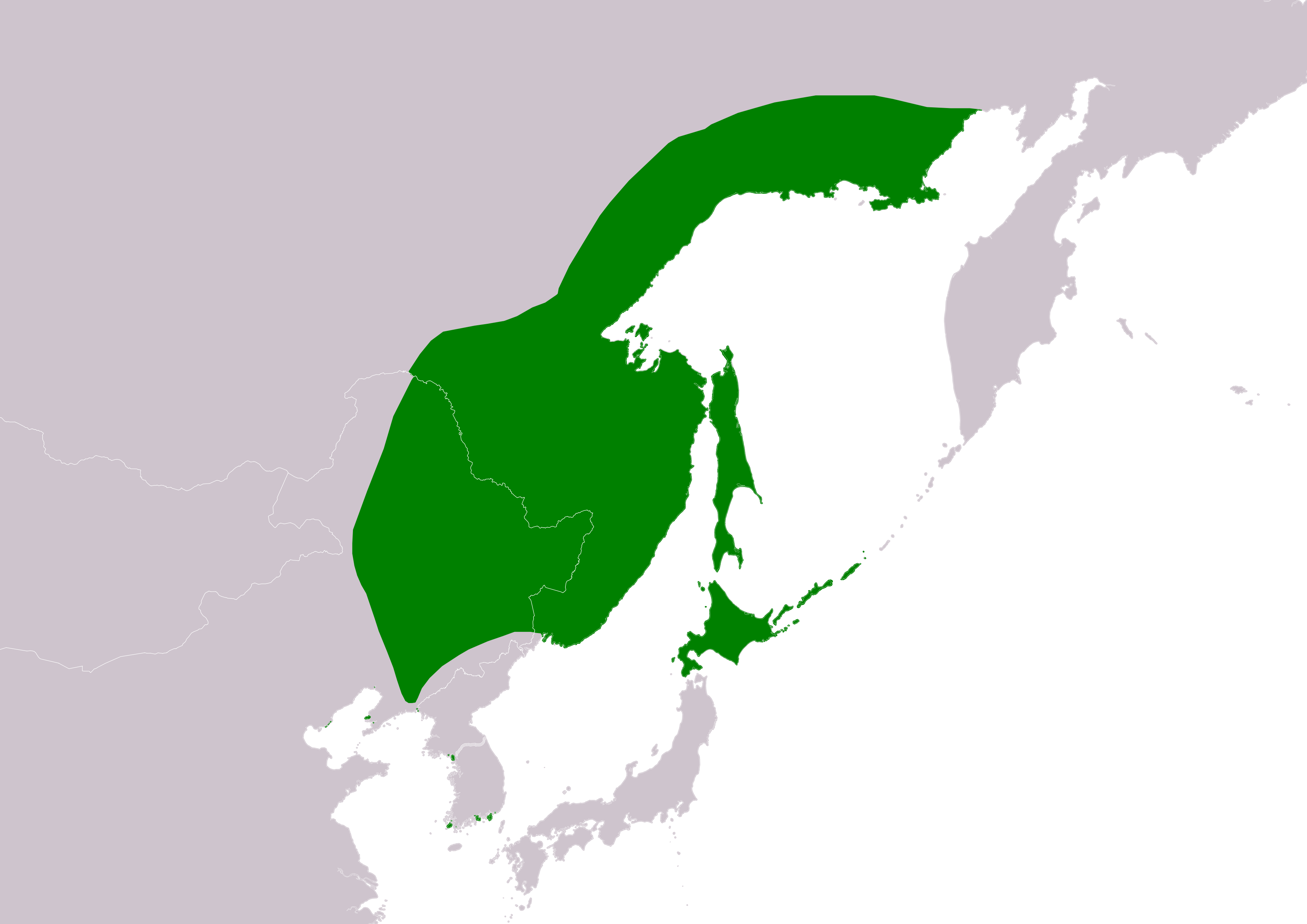
- Range of K. blakistoni Resident

Species of owl

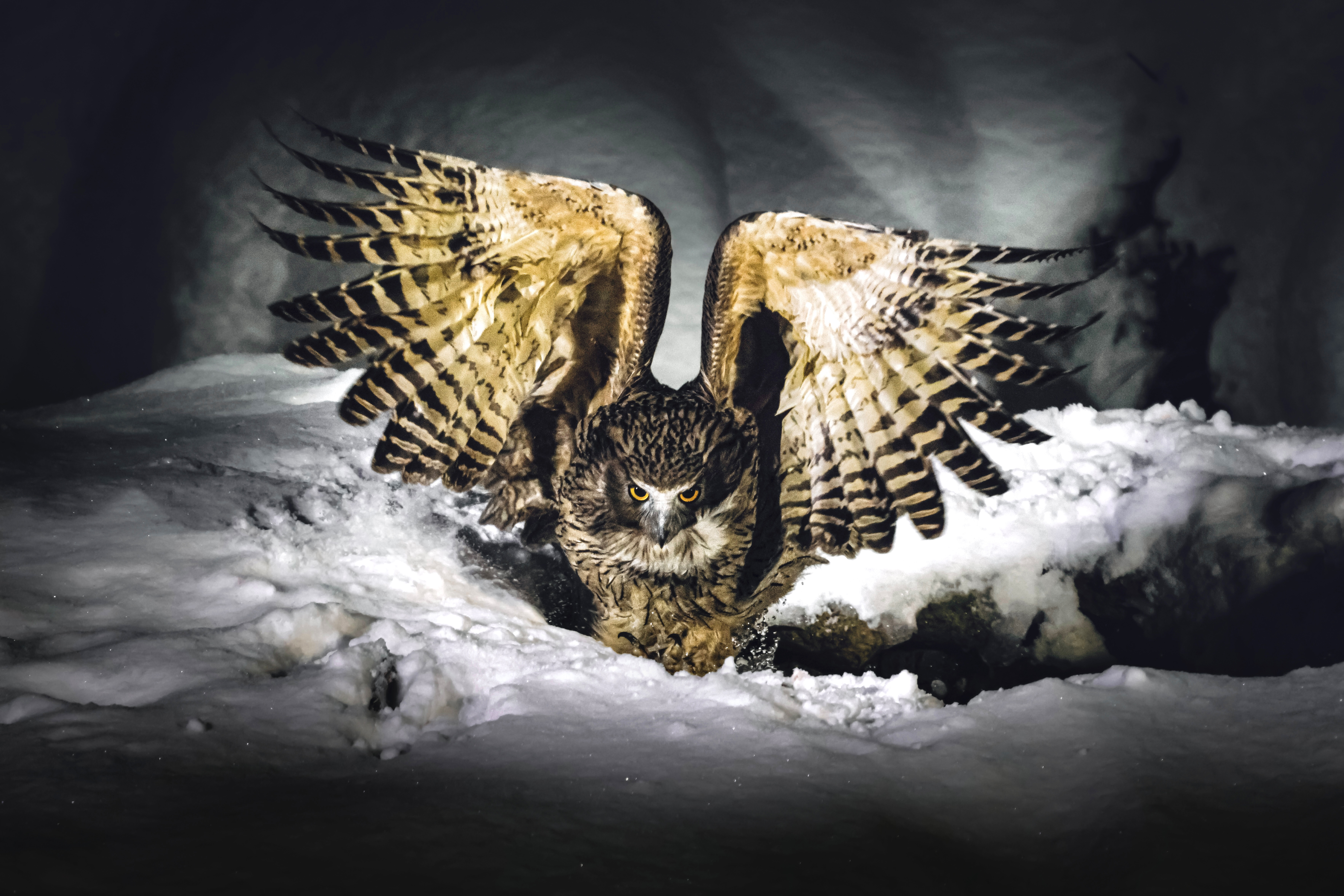

Blakiston's fish owl (Ketupa blakistoni), the largest living species of owl, is a fish owl, a sub-group of eagle-owls that specialize in hunting in riparian areas. It is native to Hokkaido in Japan and the Kuril Islands. This species is a part of the family known as typical owls (Strigidae), which contains most species of owl. Blakiston's fish owl and three other piscivorous owls are placed with some eagle-owls in the genus Ketupa. Its habitat is riparian forest with large, old trees for nest sites near lakes, rivers, springs, and shoals that do not freeze in winter. Henry Seebohm named this bird after the English naturalist Thomas Blakiston, who collected the original specimen in Hakodate on Hokkaidō, Japan in 1883.

== Taxonomy ==
Blakiston's fish owl was formally described in 1884 by the English amateur ornithologist Henry Seebohm from a specimen collected near Hakodate on the island of Hokkaido in Japan. He placed the owl in the genus Bubo and coined the binomial name Bubo blakistoni. The specific epithet was chosen to honour the naturalist and explorer Thomas Blakiston who had supplied Seebohm with a specimen. (Note: Seebohm exhibited a specimen of Blakiston's fish owl in November 1883 at a meeting of the Zoological Society. A brief description was included in the proceedings of the society but this was not published until April 1884. Seebohm's article in the Ibis was published in January 1884.)

Blakiston's fish owl is more closely related to the Eurasian eagle-owl than to the subgenus Ketupa of fish owls it was formerly believed to be closer to. This was shown by osteological and DNA-based tests in 2003 by ornithologists/taxonomists Michael Wink and Claus König, author of Owls of the World. However, the other fish owls are not believed by some authors to be divergent enough to support a separate genus either and so some authorities list fish owls as also included in the genus Bubo.

Given that it shares genetic material and osteological characteristics with the Eurasian eagle-owl, yet also seems to share some characteristics with the other three fish owls (especially the brown fish owl), the place of the Blakiston's fish owls in this evolutionary chain is ambiguous. Some authors have wondered whether the Blakiston's represents an intermediate step between traditional eagle-owls and the other fish owls, despite the current gap in distribution between Blakiston's and other fish owls. Whether other Asian eagle-owls with sideways slanting ear-tufts, namely the spot-bellied (B. nipalensis), the barred (B. sumatranus), and especially the somewhat superficially fish owl–like dusky eagle-owl (B. coromandus) are closely related to the fish owls and/or the Blakiston's is also unclear.

Although a few authors also include them in Bubo, the fishing owls of Africa (generally classified in the genus Scotopelia) seem to be fairly dissimilar. Based on external characteristics, osteology and preliminary genetic materials, the fishing owls are likely to have some convergently evolved characteristics to the fish owls and have no close relationship. Ultimately, given the lack of specific genetic studies for them, it is not clear how closely fishing owls are related to typical eagle-owls (to which fish owls are related).

Recent genetic testing indicates a fairly large divergence from the genomes of typical Bubo and suggests that they are indeed more closely aligned with other fish owls.

== Description ==
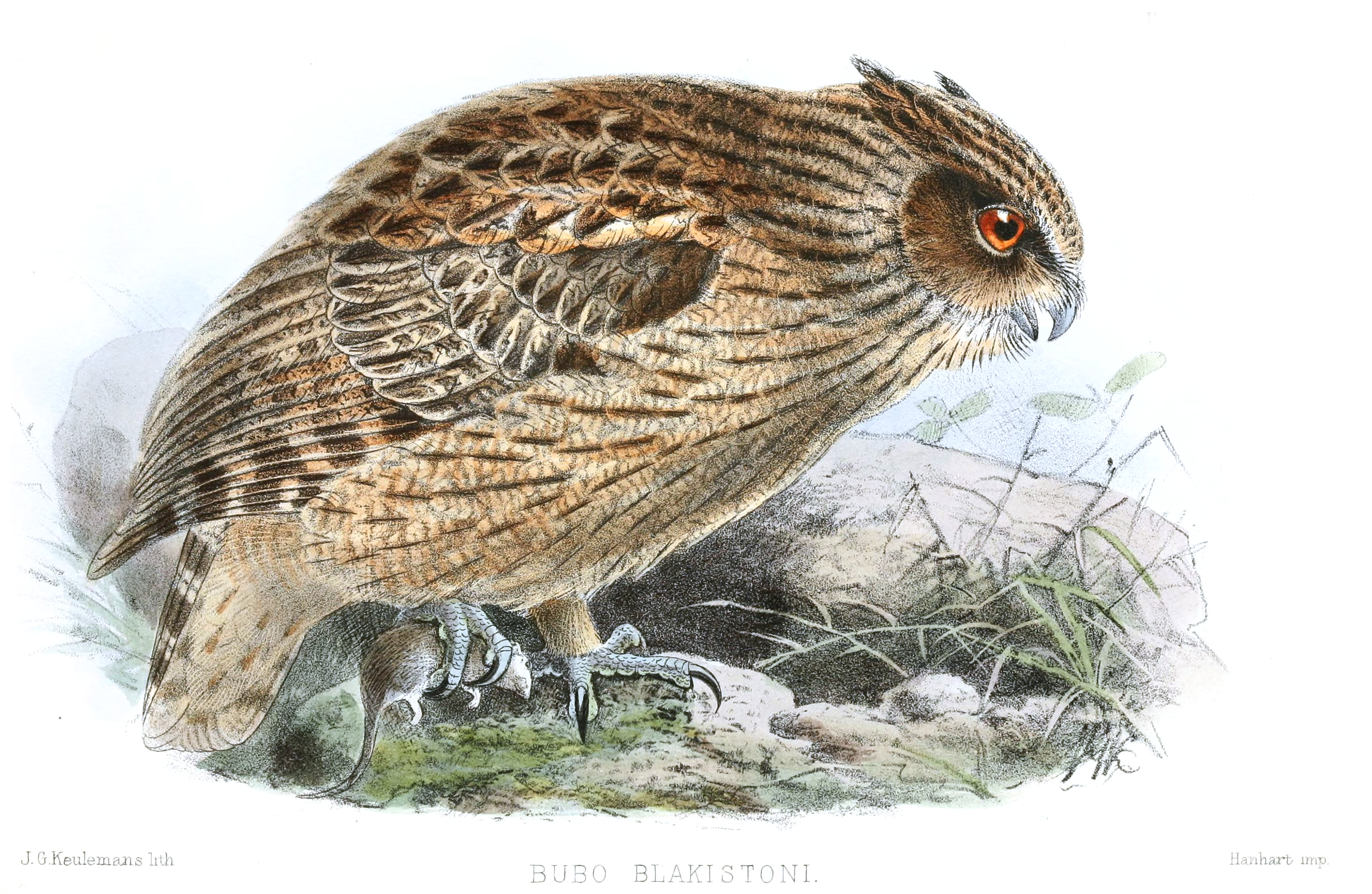
Illustration by J. G. Keulemans

Blakiston's fish owl is the largest living species of owl. A pair field study of the species showed males weighing from 2.95 to 3.6 kg (6.5 to 7.9 lb), while the female, at up to 2.95 to 4.6 kg (6.5 to 10.1 lb), is about 25% larger. Around February, the average weight of Russian fish owls was 3.1 kg (6.8 lb) in seven males and 3.25 kg (7.2 lb) in five females, typically when their body mass at its lowest throughout the year. Blakiston's fish owl measures 60 to 72 cm (24 to 28 in) in total length, and thus measures slightly less at average and maximum length than the great grey owl (Strix nebulosa), a species which has a significantly lower body mass. The Eurasian eagle-owl (B. bubo) is sometimes considered the largest overall living owl species. The three largest species of eagle-owl, all found in Siberia and the Russian Far East, are close in size to the Blakiston's fish owl. According to Heimo Mikkola, the very largest specimen of eagle-owl was 30 mm (1.2 in) longer in bill-to-tail length than the longest Blakiston's fish owl, while the top weight of the two species is exactly the same. The longest great gray owl was 120 mm (4.7 in) longer than the biggest Blakiston's fish owl but would be about 2.5 times lighter than the weight of the largest female Blakiston's. However, the average measurements of Blakiston's fish owl surpass the average measurements of the Eurasian eagle-owl in at least two of the major categories: weight and wingspan, making Blakiston's the overall largest species of owl. Even the large Siberian races of eagle-owl are slightly smaller on average than the Blakiston's, at least in terms of body mass and wing size. In the largest known body mass cited for a Eurasian eagle-owl population, the weights cited, for instance, were a mean 2.42 kg (5.3 lb) for the males and a mean of 3.164 kg (6.98 lb) for the females. The maximum wingspan of the Blakiston's fish owl is also greater than any known eagle-owl. The wingspan range known for Blakiston's fish owls is 178 to 190 cm (5 ft 10 in to 6 ft 3 in). It is possible the largest specimens can attain a wingspan of approximately 200 cm (6 ft 7 in). The Blakiston's is noticeably larger than the other three extant species of fish owl.

In terms of structure, the Blakiston's fish owl is more similar to eagle-owls than it is to other fish owls but it shares a few characteristics with both types of owl. Like all fish owls, its bill is relatively long, the body relatively husky and wings are relatively long compared to eagle-owls. It also shares with other fish owls a comparatively long tarsi, although relative to their size the three smaller fish owl have a proportionately longer tarsus. Other than these few characteristics, a Blakiston's fish owl skull and skeleton is practically the same as that of a Eurasian eagle-owl. The talons of the Blakiston's fish owl are similar in shape and size to those of the Eurasian eagle-owls. It has been stated that the combination of wavy cross patterns on the underside of the Blakiston's plumage and its huge talons make it look strikingly like an outsized great horned owl (B. virginianus) from below. Two external characteristics that Blakiston's share with eagle-owls, but not with the other fish owls, is that its tarsi are totally feathered and that its wing beats are silent, although apparently the Blakiston's has relatively fewer sound-blocking combs on its wing primaries than the a comparable eagle-owl would. Among standard measurements, which at average and maximum are greater than any other living owl other than tail length, the wing chord measures 447–560 mm (17.6–22.0 in), the tail measures 243–305 mm (9.6–12.0 in), the tarsus is 73–102 mm (2.9–4.0 in) and the culmen is around 55 to 71 mm (2.2 to 2.8 in).

Superficially, this owl somewhat resembles the Eurasian eagle-owl but is more monochromatically brown to tan in colour. Like other fish owls but unlike most eagle-owls, the Blakiston's fish owl has relatively broad and ragged ear tufts which hang slightly to the side and that do not appear upright. The upperparts are buff-brown and heavily streaked with darker brown coloration. The underparts are a paler buff brown and less heavily streaked. The throat is white. The iris is yellow (whereas the Eurasian eagle-owl typically has an orange iris). The Eurasian eagle-owl and the related northern fish owl occur in the Russian Far East and are potentially could compete for resources, although no scientifically observed interactions of any kind have been reported between these two largest owl species. It is likely, given the sizeable gap between the dietary preferences of the species (mainly aquatic animals in the Blakiston's, and mainly upland, terrestrial species in the eagle-owl), that competition for food is not normally a serious problem. Identification of the Blakiston's from other fish owls is not an issue as there is a gap of distribution of approximately 800 km (500 mi) between the ranges of the Blakiston's and the tawny fish owl (B. flavipes) and about 2,000 km (1,200 mi) separates the range of the Blakiston's and the brown fish owl (Ketupa zeylonensis). Improbably, early naturalist thought that the Blakiston's and brown fish owls belonged to the same species. The streaking on the underside of the brown and Blakiston's are similar and their songs sound more similar to each other than they do with the two songs of the other two species of fish owl, being deeper voiced with a dissimilar vocal pattern to the latter fish owl.

Vocalizations differ among the recognized subspecies. In the nominate subspecies from Japan, the male calls twice and the female responds with one note, whereas the mainland subspecies has a somewhat more elaborate, four-note duet: HOO-hoo, HOBO-hoooo (here, the male call is in capital letters (HOO) and the female call in lower case (hoo)). The transliterations of the calls of owls from Russia (northern fish owl), representative of the owl's vocal variations, are SHOO-boo and FOO-foo-foo. The territorial song or call in Russia in particular has been described as somewhat like a short, deep eagle-owl's call. Despite its slightly larger size, the Blakiston's fish owls voice is not as sonorous or as far-carrying as is the Eurasian eagle-owl's voice is. The fish owl's voice is rather deeper, however. As in most owls, vocal activity tends to peak directly before nesting activity begins, so peaks around February in this species. This duet of pairs of Blakiston's fish owl in the period leading up the breeding season is so synchronized that those unfamiliar with the call often think it is only one bird calling. When an individual bird calls, it may sound like hoo-hooo. Juveniles have a characteristic shriek, typically a startling and slurred phee-phee-phee.

== Subspecies ==
Of the following three subspecies described in the literature, only one, blakistoni, is currently accepted by science. The other two (karafutonis and piscivorus) were likely specimens of blakistoni and the northern fish owl, respectively, and are presented here only for historical interest. The divergence of the Japanese birds of the nominate subspecies and the Russian subspecies (now Northern fish owl) was found to be extreme based on phylogeography, with a point of divergence of at least a half a million years.

- K. b. blakistoni (Seebohm, 1884). Hokkaido, N. Japan and Kuriles. Lores of facial disc tawny-brown with narrow black shaft-stripes; above eyes, around bill base and on forehead a row small, stiff almost completely white feathers; chin largely white. Rest of head and underparts brown with blackish-brown shaft-stripes and buff feather tips; back is darker. The mantle is somewhat lighter and more rufous and with blackish-brown bars as well as dark brown shaft-streaks. Wings deep brown with numerous buff yellow bars. Tail dark brown with 7–8 cream-yellow bars. Underparts light buff-brown with blackish-brown shaft streaks and narrow light brown wavy cross-bars. The wing chord measures 473 to 534 mm (18.6 to 21.0 in), the tail measures 243 to 286 mm (9.6 to 11.3 in) and the tarsus measures 81 to 102 mm (3.2 to 4.0 in).
- K. b. karafutonis (Kuroda, 1931). Sakhalin. Smaller than nominate race and darker, especially on back and ear-coverts; tail with narrower dark brown bars and the light bars more numerous (8–9 against 7 in nominate).
- K. b. piscivorus (Meise, 1933). W. Manchuria. Paler overall than doerriesi, ground color of underparts grayish white (not buff-brown); tail-bars not fully creamy yellow, central rectrices having white inner webs almost to base; chin pure white.

== Habitat ==
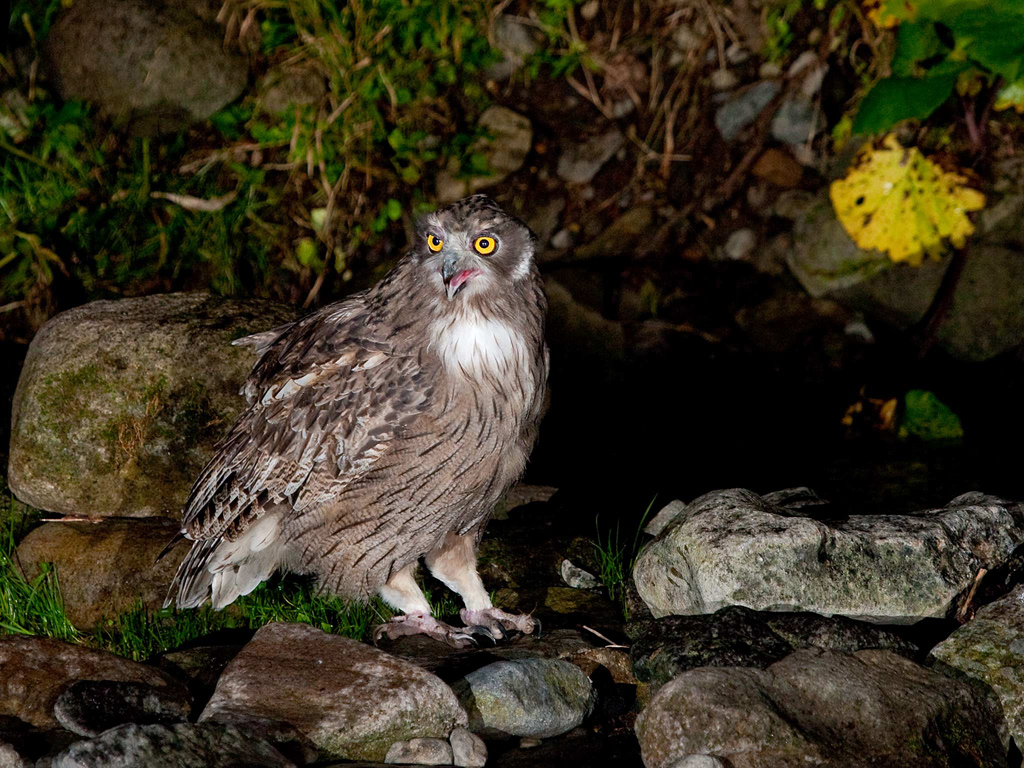
Blakiston's fish owls are amongst the most aquatically based owls in the world.

Blakiston's fish owl occurs in dense, minimally or undisturbed old-growth forest near waterways including floodplains or wooded coastlines. The species requires cavernous old-growth tree cavities for suitable nest sites. They are easily one of the largest birds to use tree hollows anywhere. Although found near the taiga zone, nest trees are generally deciduous and the species resides in mixed forests. Blakiston's fish owls typically require stretches of productive rivers that remain at least partially unfrozen in winter. In the frigid northern winters, open water is found only where the current is sufficiently fast-flowing or there is an upwelling of warm spring water. Slower-moving streams are equally likely to support these owls as the main river channels and they only need a few meters of open water to survive a winter.

== Feeding and behavior ==
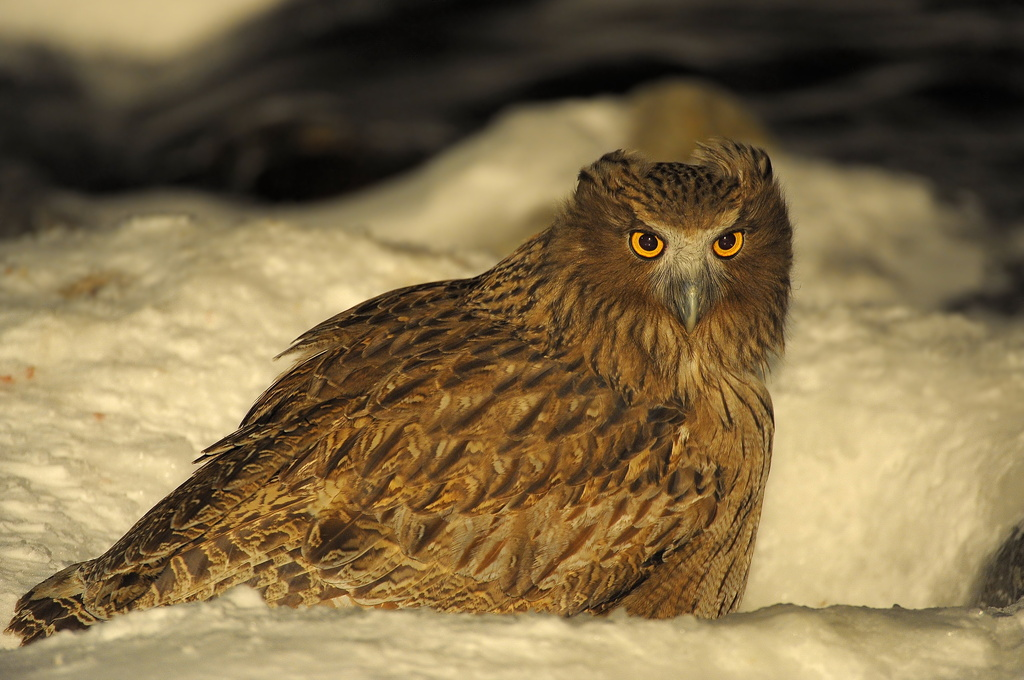
A Blakiston's fish owl hunting during winter.

The Blakiston's fish owl feeds on a variety of aquatic prey. The main prey type is fish, with common prey including pike (Esox reichertii), catfish, trout and salmon (Oncorhynchus ssp.). Some fish these owls catch are quite large. Jonathan Slaght estimated that some fish caught are up to two to three times their own weight and has seen owls keep one foot on a tree root to be able to haul a large catch onto a bank. The main prey suspected to be sought out in freezing winter months in flowing and brackish waters at the northeastern limits of their range were sculpin, lamprey and salmon, likely largely juveniles of the latter two types. In the basin of the Bikin River, the mean body mass of fish caught was estimated at 0.6 to 0.9 kg (1.3 to 2.0 lb). Crayfish (Cambaroides ssp.) and other crustaceans are known to be taken in some numbers, but the extent of their importance in the Blakiston's fish owl's diet is unknown. There is some evidence of sexual dimorphism in prey selection with males favouring frogs and smaller fish, while females preyed on larger fish. Freshwater crabs and secondarily frogs seem to be numerical as important, or sometimes more significant, as a source of food as compared to fish for the three smaller fish owl species, other than frogs during spring thus far this has not proven to be the case with the Blakiston's fish owl. The only owl species to which fish are more significant to their diet is the fishing owls of Africa. Blakiston's fish owls seem to co-exist with Steller's sea eagles (Haliaeetus pelagicus) and white-tailed eagles (H. albicilla) on the coasts of the rocky Kuril Islands but nothing is known how they relate with these larger fish-eating raptors, the presence of which has sometimes been theorized as partially the cause of the restricted range of the Blakiston's due to competition for similar food resources. However, in other raptor communities, diurnal raptors and owls can co-exist successfully given their distinct times of activity. Furthermore, Blakiston's fish owl generally dwells in forested areas while sea eagles are more likely to forage near more open wetland or coastal areas.

A wide variety of mammalian prey are described from Japan and becomes most important to the diet during winter. Smaller mammals taken have included martens (Martes ssp.) and numerous rodents. Unidentified bats have turned up occasionally in Blakiston's fish owl pellets in the Russian Far East, although bats were much more prominent in the diet of Eurasian eagle-owls there (79 eagle-owl pellets and 10 fish owl pellets had bat remains, respectively). Large mammals are sometimes taken by this species, including hares (Lepus ssp.), rabbits, fox, cats (Felis catus) and small dogs (Canis lupus familiaris). Fewer records are known of bird predation, but they are known to capture avian prey such as hazel grouse (Tetrastes bonasia) and a variety of waterfowl species. A case where a black-crowned night heron (Nycticorax nycticorax), a rare species in Japan, was chased in flight by a male fish owl was observed but the heron managed to evade capture. A similar case of a fish owl chasing a grey heron (Ardea cinerea) has also been reported.

The two most common hunting methods for Blakiston's fish owl are wading through river shallows and perching on the river bank and waiting for movement in the water. Other waterside perches may include logs. In this behavior, an individual may wait for four hours until it detects prey and the species is perhaps most often witnessed while hunting in this method. Upon identifying prey, fish owls either drop directly into the shallow water or sail a short distance. While small prey such as frogs and crayfish are taken back to an habitual perch for immediate consumption, larger prey such as fish and waterfowl are dragged onto a bank and finished off before being flown off with.

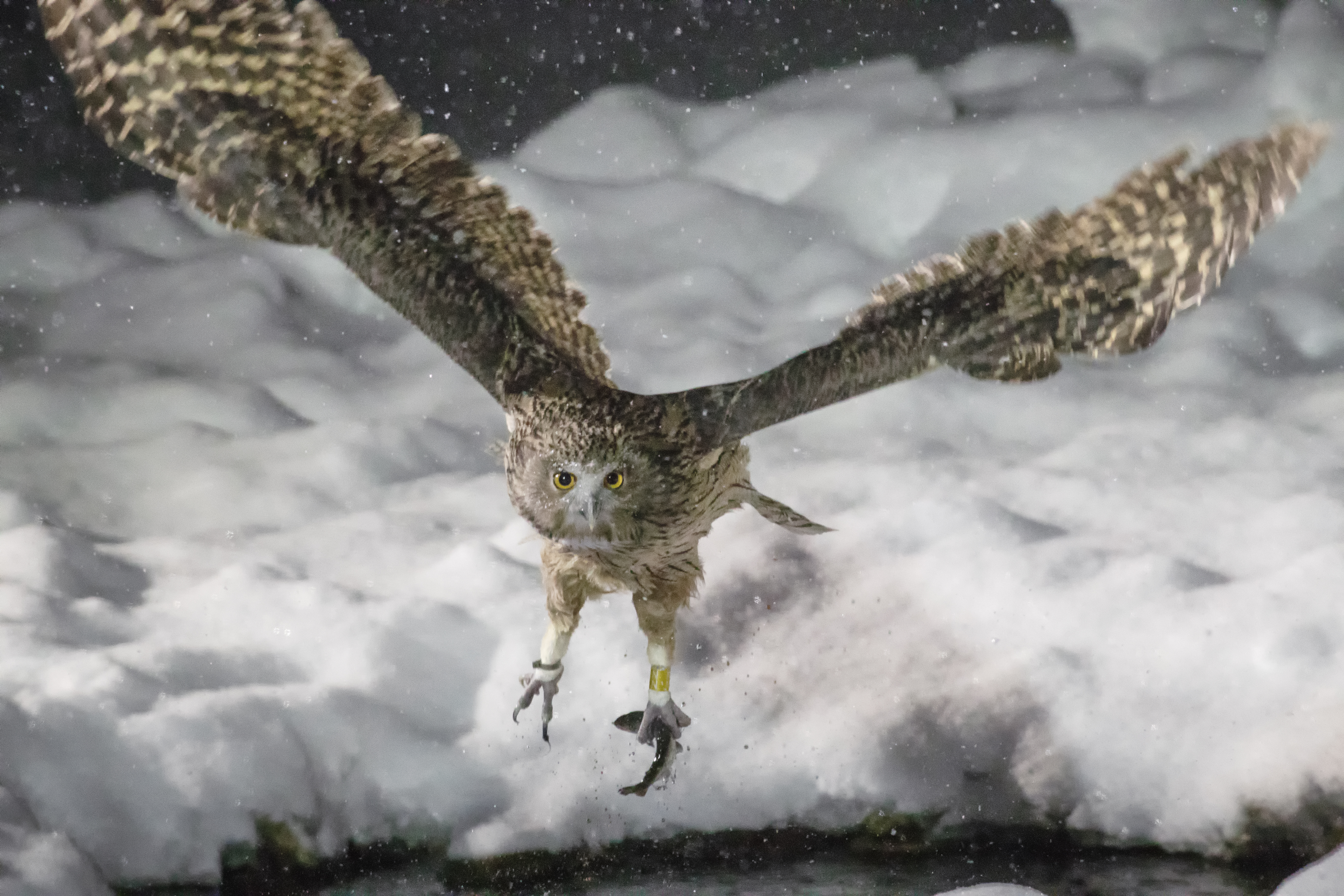
A Blakiston's fish owl flies off with a fish

These owls are primarily active at dusk and dawn. During the brood-rearing season, these owls are relatively more likely to be seen actively hunting or brooding during the day. For an owl, it spends unusual amounts of time on the ground. Occasionally, an owl may even trample out a regular footpath along riverbanks it uses for hunting. Early reports of concentrations of as many as 5–6 owls near rapids and non-freezing springs are dubious, as these owls are highly territorial.

=== Breeding ===
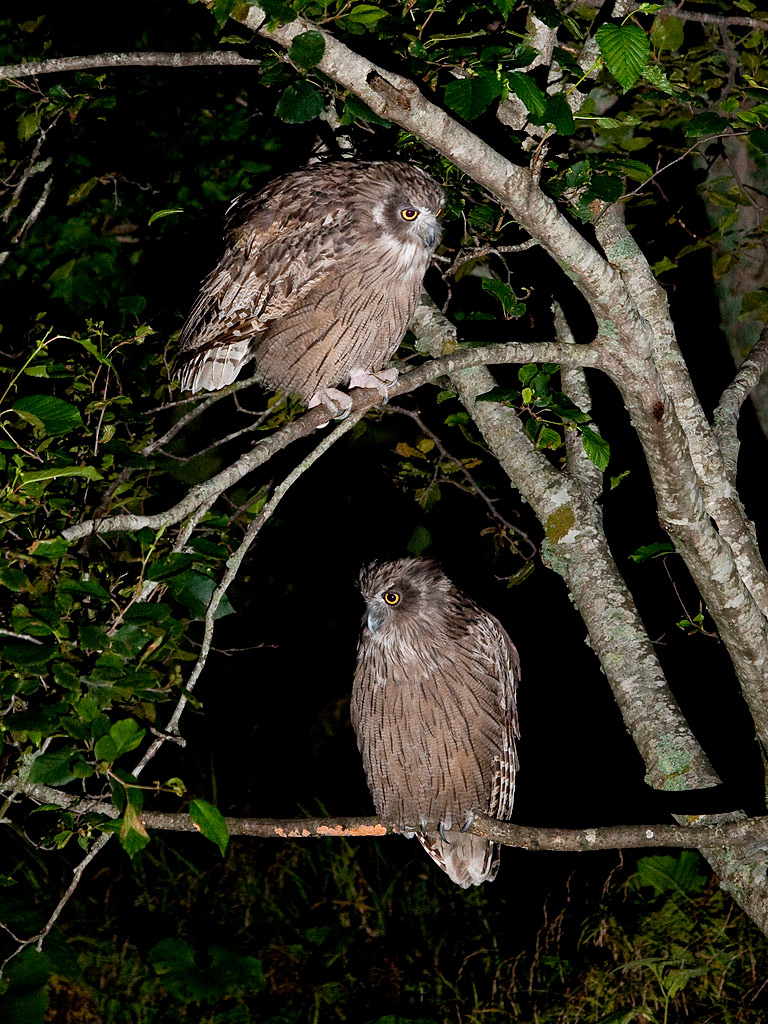
A pair of adult Blakiston's fish owls, possibly a mated pair.

This bird does not breed every year due to fluctuations in food supply and conditions. Courting occurs in January or February. Laying of eggs begins as early as mid-March, when ground and trees are still covered with snow. These owls prefer nesting in hollow tree cavities in Japan and Russia. Mature forests with a mixture of coniferous and deciduous trees is usually the preferred nesting habitat. In Russia, trees selected for nesting can consist of elm (Ulmus ssp.), Japanese poplar (Populus maximowiczii), willow (Salix ssp.), Mongolian oak (Quercus mongolica), ash (Sorbus ssp.), and stone birch (Betula ermanii). Nest height range is 2–18 m (10–60 ft), but normally is at least 12 m (39 ft) off the ground. Reports of nesting on fallen tree trunks and on the forest floor are very rare occurrences at best and possibly untrue. Other than nest cavities, there are very isolated records of nesting on cliff shelves and in old black kite (Milvus migrans) nests. Additionally, Blakiston's fish owl have now been recorded using temporarily abandoned nests of Steller's sea eagles.

Nest cavities have to be quite large in order to accommodate these birds. Clutch size is 1 to 3, usually 2. Eggs are 6.2 cm (2.4 in) long and 4.9 cm (1.9 in) wide and are thus similar in size to Siberian eagle-owl eggs. The males provide food for the incubating female and later the nestlings. The incubation period is about 35 days and young leave the nest within 35–40 days but are often fed and cared for by their parents for several more months. Data on breeding success are scant: on Kunashir Island during a six-year period breeding success was 24%; with six fledglings resulting from 25 eggs. The average weight of fledgling owls was about 40% lighter than adult size, averaging 1.96 kg (4.3 lb) in females and 1.85 kg (4.1 lb) in males. Juveniles linger on their parents' territory for up to two years before dispersing to find their own. A study in Hokkaido found that male fledglings were about 10% more numerous than females but had a higher mortality rate post-fledgling. Blakiston's fish owls can form pair bonds as early as their second year and reach sexual maturity by age three. This unusually long pre-dispersal period may be why this owl is occasionally reported as gregarious, as sets of parents and juveniles will congregate but not unrelated owls.

Once full-sized, these owls have few natural predators. However, they may be more vulnerable to attack from mammalian carnivores since, unlike other eagle owls which typically perch and hunt from trees or inaccessible rock formations, they hunt mainly on the ground along riverbanks.

== Status ==
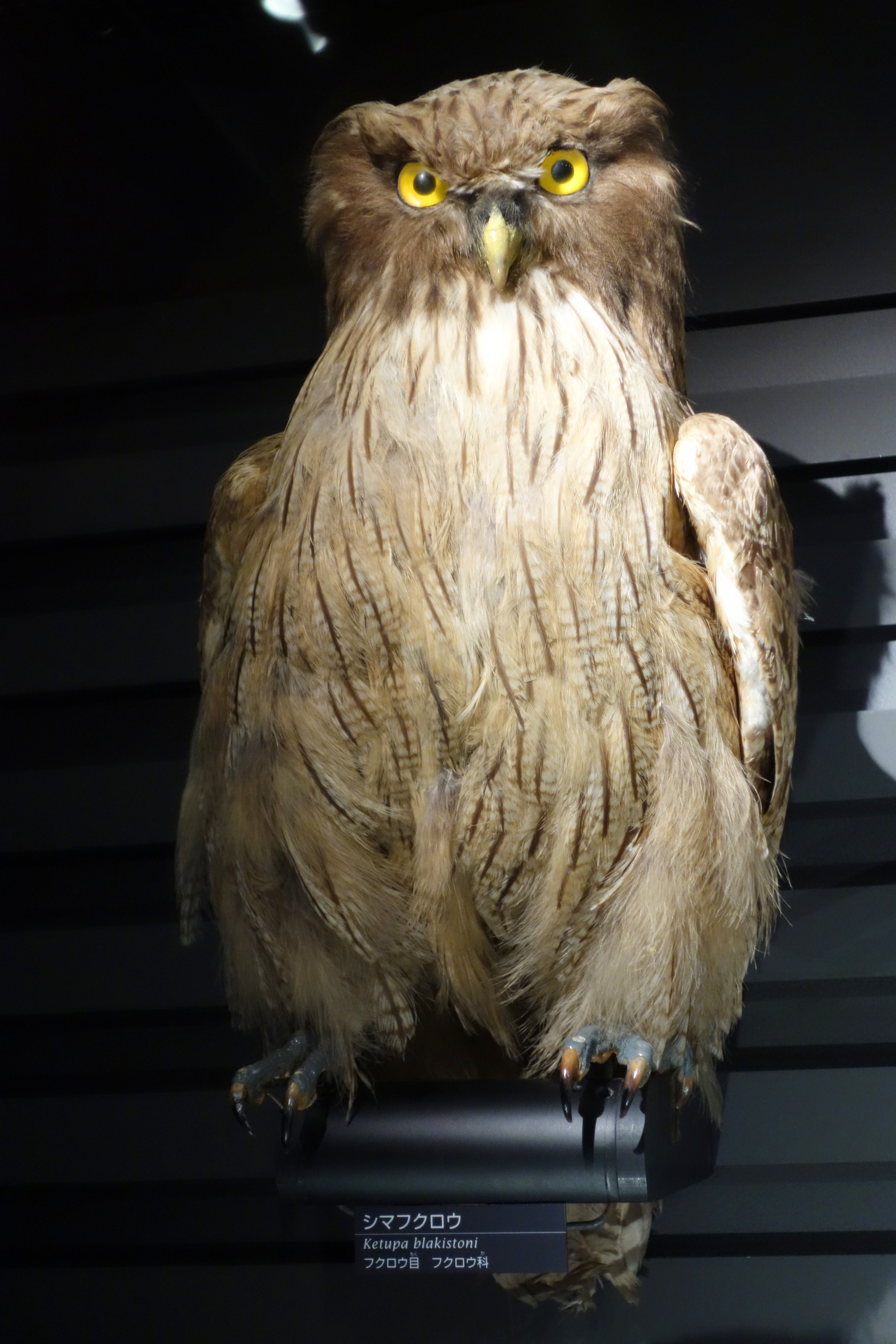
A stuffed Blakiston's fish owl at the National Museum of Nature and Science in Tokyo.

Blakiston's fish owl is classified as an Endangered Species by the IUCN. It is endangered due to the widespread loss of riverine forest, increasing land development along rivers and dam construction. The current population in Japan has been estimated at 100–150 birds (20 breeding pairs and unpaired individuals), whereas on mainland Asia the population is higher, at times variously estimated at several hundred or perhaps up to thousands of individuals.During surveys in 2016–2019 on Kunashir Island, 28 pairs of Blakiston's fish owls were registered. In Japan, death by hunting is unlikely, but fish owls have been hit by cars and killed by power lines. Additionally, cases of exposure to lead or lead poisoning, possibly from bioaccumulation but also perhaps lead bullets in carrion, have been reported in these owls in at least Japan. Given their very small global population, ongoing deaths are unlikely to be sustainable. Local conservation efforts in Japan have been undertaken including education, installation of large nest-boxes and supplemental feeding. Biologists have found the presence of Blakiston's fish owls as good indicators of the health and disturbance level of a forest and of fish populations. An additional concern was a clear lack of genetic diversity found in Russia's fish owls upon the testing of their genome, with similar concerns expressed in Japan as well as evidence of inbreeding. Evidence has been found of a gradual recovery of the Blakiston's fish owl population in Hokkaido but Japanese conservationists are vexed by the lack of suitable habitat and recommend land use changes to encourage the growth of the population.

== Importance to indigenous peoples ==
Blakiston's fish owl is revered by the Ainu peoples of Hokkaido, Japan, as a Kamuy (divine being) called Kotan koru Kamuy (God that Protects the Village). In Russia, the species is considered a food source by the Evens people in northern Siberia and the northern Russian Far East. In the past, fish owls were hunted as a favoured food source by the Udege peoples in Primorye due to their high fat content, and their wings and tails were dried and used as fans to disperse biting insects while hunting; however, the practice has locally fallen out of favour.
