= Northern fish owl =

- In Zov Tigra National Park, Primorsky Krai, Russia

Conservation status
- Not evaluated (IUCN 3.1)

Scientific classification
- Kingdom: Animalia
- Phylum: Chordata
- Class: Aves
- Order: Strigiformes
- Family: Strigidae
- Genus: Ketupa
- Species: K. doerriesi

Binomial name
- Ketupa doerriesi (Seebohm, 1895)

Synonyms
- Ketupa blakistoni doerriesi; Ketupa blakistoni piscivorus; Bubo doerriesi

Species of bird

The Northern fish owl (Ketupa doerriesi) is a species of owl. It is the largest living owl in the world, with a mass of up to 4.6 kg and a length of up to 77 cm. It is found throughout Far Eastern Russia and parts of north-eastern China. It is a specialist hunter in moist mixed forest and deciduous habitats. It was formally described by Henry Seebohm in 1895, and he named this species doerriesi after the collector, Friedrich Dörries.

== Taxonomy and systematics ==
The northern fish-owl was considered conspecific with the Blakiston's fish owl until 2026, when it was elevated to species level based on differences in bioacoustic differences, especially in vocal duets, and plumage differences. They are thought to have diverged 560000-770000 years ago.

This species was formally described by Henry Seebohm in volume 29 of the Bulletin of the British Ornithologists' Club. The holotype was an adult female collected by Jan Kalinowski sometime between 13 May and 12 June 1885 from Bezverkhovo, Primorsky Krai.

Two subspecies belonging to this species were described, but the subspecies piscivorus is considered a synonym, so this species is considered monotypic.

The subspecies Ketupa doerriesi piscivorus was described as Bubo blakistoni piscivorus by Wilhelm Meise in 1933 from the type locality of Yakeshi, Inner Mongolia, China. The holotype was collected by Walther Stötzner on 2 June 1927. This subspecies is paler, the base color of the underparts is grayish-white and the base color of the tail is white.

The genus name Ketupa comes from the Malay word for the buffy fish owl, which is ketupok. The specific epithet doerriesi commemorates Friedrich Dörries, who was one of the first people to collect a specimen.

== Description ==
The northern fish owl is an enormous, brownish owl with prominent ear tufts that extend laterally. It is the world's largest owl; with an overall length of 60-77 cm, a mass of 3100-4600 grams, and a wingspan of 178-190 cm.

The adults are medium brown above and pale-buff below. The mantle is mid-brown with large blackish streaks, while the tertials are barred tan. The nape has a white patch that can be hidden depending on the position of the owl. The brown facial disks are plain with a faint whitish crescent, which gives a 'goggled' appearance in some owls. The chin and forehead are white, with a thin whitish line extending from the forehead to the supercilium. The upper throat is brown, while the lower throat and upper chest are white. The underparts have narrow black stripes, while the short tail has 7-8 wavy crossbars. The juveniles are similar in plumage to the adults, and the differences between them are not well known, however, in the related Blakiston's fish owl, the juvenile have higher contrasting internal wing coverts.

The Eurasian eagle owl is the only owl that is likely to be confused with the northern fish owl. The Eurasian eagle-owl differs from the northern fish owl in having broader black breast streaks, narrower ear tufts, a longer tail, absence of white on the nape, and feathered toes.

The bill is small and stout, with a sharp tip used for tearing flesh. Typically, only the maxilla is visible, which is blue grey to blackish with a small pale tip. The mandible is horn colored at the base and grey at the tip. The gape of adults is pink in some individuals. In both adults and juveniles, the iris is yellow or close to orange yellow, with the orbital skin blackish. The legs and feet are large and strong, with sharp talons for catching prey. The tarsi are feathered but the toes are exposed. The toes are horn grey to blue grey, sometimes pinkish, and the talons are black with a greyish base.

== Vocalisations ==
The vocalizations of this species are rather limited, and lone singing birds are not often heard. This species is most often heard singing in pairs. On calm days the duet can be heard from up to 3-3.5 km away. The duet is used for pair bonding as well as territorial management and is heard year-round. It lasts for about 120 minutes at a time.

The song, sung by a lone bird, consists of a hooo-hoo call, followed by a hoo-hoooo call, with a gap of about 2-4 seconds in between the two hoots. This song bears some resemblance to the duet call given by both members of the pair. However, in the Blakiston's fish owl, the lone singing call only resembles the male's part of a duet.

The duet of this species is an uncommon habit and is known in only 4% of global bird species, most of which are in the tropics. The duet consists of four notes, hoo hoo hoo-ooooo. The duet is usually initiated with the male, with the male singing the first and third notes while the female sings the second and fourth. The male fills an air sac in his throat, expanding it fully, and then giving a wheezy exhale, which the female answers immediately to. However, if the pair is agitated, the female initiates the duet, so the female sings the first and third notes, while the male sings the second and fourth. The pair's calls are often so closely synchronized that it appears that only one bird is singing. The male's first note is at 0 seconds; the female's first note is at 0.3-0.5 seconds; the male's second note is given at 1 second; and the female's second notes is given at about 1.25 seconds, almost immediately after the ending of the male's second note.

The duet is given throughout the year, with peaks in February and March, and during the egg-laying season. The pairs begin duetting 20-40 minutes after sunset, and the pair sings from the canopy of broadleaf trees. From November to January, the duet lasted from 5:00 PM to 6:30 PM, and in February, from about 6:00 PM to 8:00 PM. Sometimes the birds are heard vocalizing in the early hours of the morning, from 6:00 AM to 7:00 AM.

The call is a harsh, descending whistle, given as a begging call by chicks and by females during courtship when the male arrives with a food gift. Another call, a bark, is given when an owl is alarmed.

== Distribution ==
This species is found in the Russian Far East and north-eastern China. In Russia, there are isolated populations in the Amur Oblast and near Yamsk in Magadan Oblast. It is found along most of the river drainages that flow into the Sea of Japan, from the Avvakumovka River to the Bikin River and the Khor River which flow into the Sea of Okhotsk through the Ussuri. This species was historically known to occur from Khasan in Primorsky Krai, but no longer seems to appear in this region, except possibly as a vagrant.

All of the records from north-eastern China are before 1990, so it may not occur there anymore. This species is also extremely uncommon in Sakhalin, with only one known record. This species may also occur in North Korea, due to the proximity of some of the Russian records of this species to the North Korean border. However, a review of the ornithological literature of North Korea did not find any records of fish owls.

== Habitat and migration ==
The northern fish owl is a year-round resident to its breeding territory. So, the suitable territory must fulfill the owl's needs year-round. Suitable territories contain large broadleaf trees, with cavities for nesting, and a river or spring that flows through the winter for foraging, with plentiful fish, and at least one or two openings.

Territories contain stretches of rivers, especially those with wooden debris in and around the water, and the forests surrounding these rivers are typically broadleaf or mixed broadleaf-conifer.

This species is thought to be nonmigratory but makes short distance movements during changes in the seasons.

== Diet and foraging ==
The main diet of the northern fish owl is fish, although it also feeds on amphibians, small mammals and waterfowl. An important part of its diet in the spring is the Dybowski's frog, as they are most numerous in the spring. Fish owls have been reported to hunt at village dumps, so rodents may constitute a small part of their diet. Crayfish were reported to be consumed in small numbers.

Major prey items during the winter include masu salmon, chum salmon, Dolly Varden trout, white-spotted char, Amur minnow, sharp-snouted lenok and sculpins. In the summer, lamprey and salmon are consumed.

This species is a mainly crepuscular hunter and uses a variety of hunting techniques. The most common method involves the owl sitting on a low perch, such as a log, rock or an ice edge, and dropping onto prey in shallow water once spotted. Another method is walking along the edge of shallow water, and wading into the water intermittently when prey is detected. This species may also search for hibernating frogs by digging into pebbly substrates. Small prey is taken to a perch for consumption, while large prey is partially consumed on the riverbank before being taken to a perch. This species apparently scavenges for food in the winter, as it has been caught in snare lines intended for sables and eurasian otters.

== Behaviour ==
The northern fish owl adopts a vertical posture, with shoulders hunched forward occasionally. This species has been described as hopping and walking while hunting. It occasionally wades into streams in pursuit of prey and often stands on sunny exposed perches in the winter to warm up. During the daytime in winter, it commonly roosts on sticks or heaps of driftwood.

This species is socially monogamous and uses duets and ritual feeding in pair bonding and maintenance. This species is usually found singly, in pairs, or in family groups. This species is territorial.

== Breeding ==
Established pairs court annually in January and February. The northern fish owl lays its eggs in February and March, on average, owls in the southern part of its range (like in Primorsky Krai) lay their eggs about a month earlier than the owls in the northern part of its range (like in Magadan Oblast). A maximum of one brood per season is raised. Some birds migrate south in the winter to breed, while some winter in their home territories.

The northern fish owl nest is almost always placed in top or side cavities of old-growth deciduous trees. Out of 20 nest sites, 11 nests were placed in Japanese balsam poplar, 6 in Korean willow trees and 3 in elm trees. The height of the trees was on average 13.6 m and the height of the nests above the ground was 9.6 m. One nest was found in the fork of a Japanese balsam poplar tree and one in the unused nest of a Steller's sea eagle in Magadan.

The eggs are white in color, and the clutch size is one or two eggs, though nests with three eggs have been reported. The incubation period for the eggs is about 35 days and the female incubates the nest while the male brings food. The female continues to brood the chicks during the day after hatching but joins the male in hunting during the night. Both parents feed the chicks and food is given once every 40-60 minutes. Most of the prey deliveries happen during the first half of the night, between 7 PM and 12 AM.

The chicks depart from the nest after about 50 days after hatching. The young birds are led to foraging areas by the parents and are introduced to hunting techniques. After they leave the nest, they have a limited ability to fly and are vulnerable to predators and hence they often walk, at least in part, from their nest site to their first foraging site. Juveniles typically remain on their natal territory until May or June of the year after they hatch.

The northern fish owl usually first breeds after it reaches three years of age. It does not breed every year, and it is unclear why it chooses to breed one year but not another.

== Conservation, management and threats ==
In 2018, the estimated global population of northern fish owls was 830-1630 individuals, with 391-748 territorial pairs. The vast majority of territorial pairs were in Russia, with about 246-494 in Khabarovsk Krai, 105-186 in Primorsky Krai, 14-19 pairs in Magadan Oblast and 13-25 pairs in Amur Oblast. In north-eastern China, there were a maximum of 15 pairs.

It is estimated that the concentration of breeding pairs in suitable habitat is 6-12 km. Around the Samarga river, the concentration of breeding pairs is one pair for every 3.8 km, possibly the highest anywhere in the world.

There has been a recorded decline in population, primarily because of habitat degradation and destruction, but it is also due to the hunting of these birds, being trapped as bycatch in the fur trade, or being entangled in fishing nets. Logging is also a considerable threat, and even though Russian law protects riparian habitats from harvest, such laws are not always enforced in the Far East, and loopholes in the law are exploited. As of 2015, in Russia, 43% of suitable northern fish owl habitat was under active logging leases, and the rest was either in protected areas or federal lands. The increased intensity of typhoons has led to an increased loss of habitat.

The only known predation of an adult was by a Eurasian lynx. The bird was predated as it fished along a riverbank. Recently fledged juveniles are known to be predated by foxes and domestic dogs. Young in the nest are known to be predated by Asian black bears, which climbed the tree to access the chick, and the yellow-throated marten. Out of 28 nests in Russia that were studied, 31 out of the 54 eggs (57%) hatched and 30 out of the 31 chicks (97%) fledged. Out of the 30 fledglings, 5 were followed over time, and 4 survived to disperse, while 1 died.

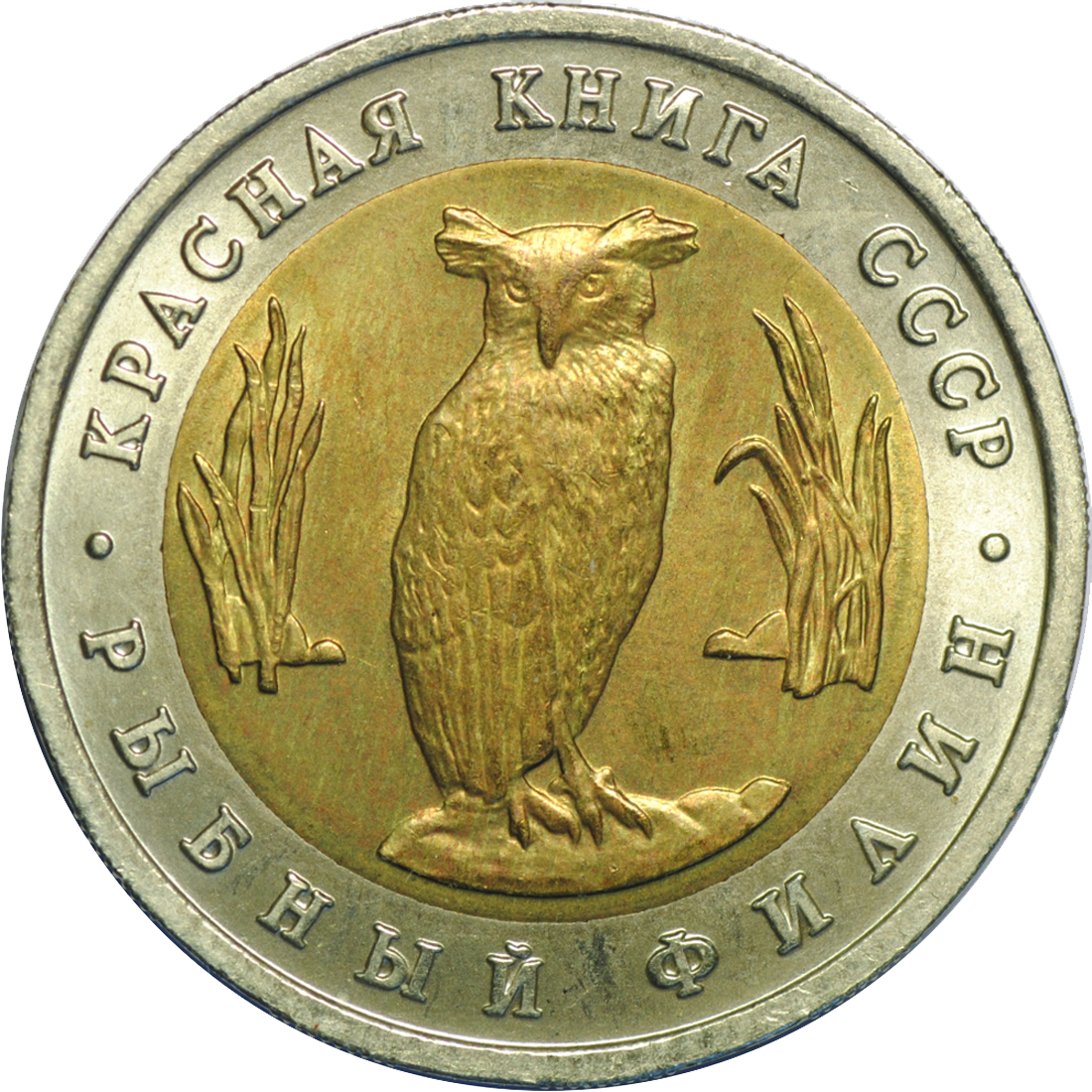
5 ruble coin of the Soviet Union depicting the northern fish owl

Almost all known cases of northern fish owl deaths occur in encounters with humans. The birds are shot by hunters, drowned in poacher nets or killed by traps meant for sable. Out of 48 birds caught in snare lines, 41 were killed by the trapper. In another instance 10 birds were reported to have been shot wantonly and 2 were shot to be taxidermized. The birds are also known to die due to collisions with vehicles.

== Cultural significance ==
In Russia, reindeer herdsmen call the northern fish owl oomyl or some variation of that name. The species name in Russian is "Ribny Filin" which means "Fish Eagle Owl".

The northern fish owl is also a traditional food of the Evens and the Udege people. The Udege use fish owl wings as fans to dissipate insect swarms.

The Soviet Union issued a commemorative 5-ruble coin in 1991 depicting the northern fish owl.
