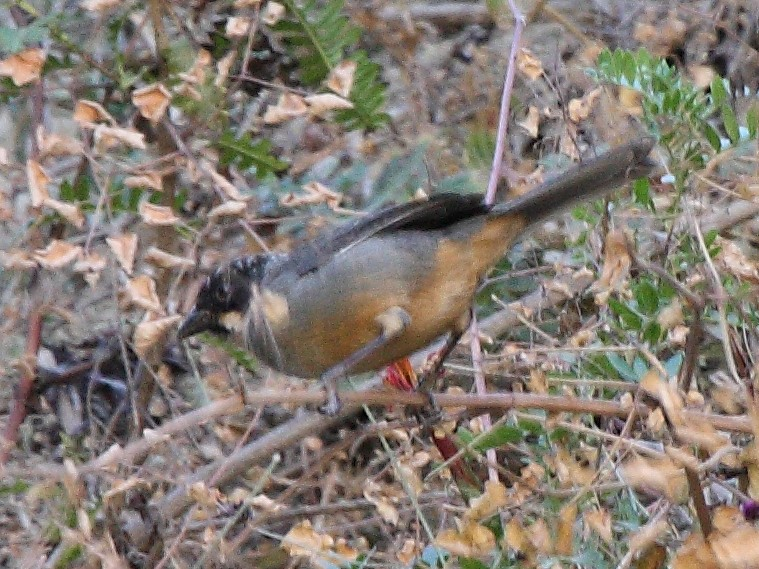

Conservation status
- Least Concern (IUCN 3.1)

Scientific classification
- Kingdom: Animalia
- Phylum: Chordata
- Class: Aves
- Order: Passeriformes
- Family: Passerellidae
- Genus: Atlapetes
- Species: A. nationi

Binomial name
- Atlapetes nationi (Sclater, PL, 1881)

= Rusty-bellied brushfinch =

Species of bird

The rusty-bellied brushfinch (Atlapetes nationi) is a species of bird in the family Passerellidae, the New World sparrows. It is endemic to Peru.

== Taxonomy and systematics ==
The rusty-bellied brushfinch was formally described in 1881 with the binomial Buarremon nationi. Its specific epithet honors William Nation, who provided the type specimen. Genus Buarremon was merged into Atlapetes early in the twentieth century. Various authors have treated the rusty-bellied brushfinch as conspecific with one of the slaty brushfinch (A. schistaceus) or the bay-crowned brushfinch (A. seebohmi).

The rusty-bellied brushfinch has two subspecies, the nominate A. n. nationi (Sclater, PL, 1881) and A. n. brunneiceps (Berlepsch and Stolzmann, 1906).

== Description ==
The rusty-bellied brushfinch is 17 to 19 cm (6.7 to 7.5 in) long and weighs about 40 to 43 g (1.4 to 1.5 oz). The sexes have the same plumage. Adults of the nominate subspecies have a black forehead and a dark olive crown. Their face is black with a wide white lower cheek and a thin black line below the front of it. Their upperparts are lead gray; their wings and tail are slightly darker with white on the marginal coverts. Their chin is black and their throat white with a wide gray breastband below it that extends along the flanks. The rest of their breast, their belly, and their crissum are cinnamon-buff. Juveniles have a brown wash on their upperparts; their underparts are mostly brownish with buff streaks. Subspecies A. n. brunneiceps is paler overall than the nominate. It sometimes has white speckles on the crown and face. Its paler grayish upperparts have a slight olive tone. Its breastband is indistinct and its throat and underparts are tawny or dark buff. Both subspecies have a dark red-brown iris, a long, thick-based blackish bill, and gray to dusky brown legs and feet.

== Distribution and habitat ==
The rusty-bellied brushfinch is a bird of the western Andes of central to southern Peru. The nominate subspecies is the more northerly of the two and has much the smaller range. It is found only in the Department of Lima. Subspecies A. n. brunneiceps is found from southern Lima south to Arequipa Department. The species inhabits dry montane scrublands and patches of woodland at elevations between 2,100 and 4,000 m (6,900 and 13,100 ft).

== Behavior ==
=== Movement ===
The rusty-bellied brushfinch is a year-round resident.

=== Feeding ===
The rusty-bellied brushfinch's diet has not been studied. It forages on the ground or slightly above it in vegetation. It typically forages in pairs or small family groups.

=== Breeding ===
Juvenile rusty-bellied brushfinches have been recorded in Lima in June. Nothing else is known about the species' breeding biology.

=== Vocalization ===
As of May 2026 neither xeno-canto nor the Cornell Lab of Ornithology's Macaulay Library had recordings of the rusty-bellied brushfinch's song. Excited pairs of rusty-bellied brushfinches duet with "a rapid, simple chatter". The species' calls are "a hard, rich tchi" and "a high ti".

== Status ==
The IUCN has assessed the rusty-bellied brushfinch as being of Least Concern. Its population size is not known and is believed to be decreasing. No immediate threats have been identified. It is "fairly common in central Peru but becoming more uncommon further south. It is further described as "very local".
