= Ile-Balkhash State Nature Reserve =

Wildlife area, Kazakhstan

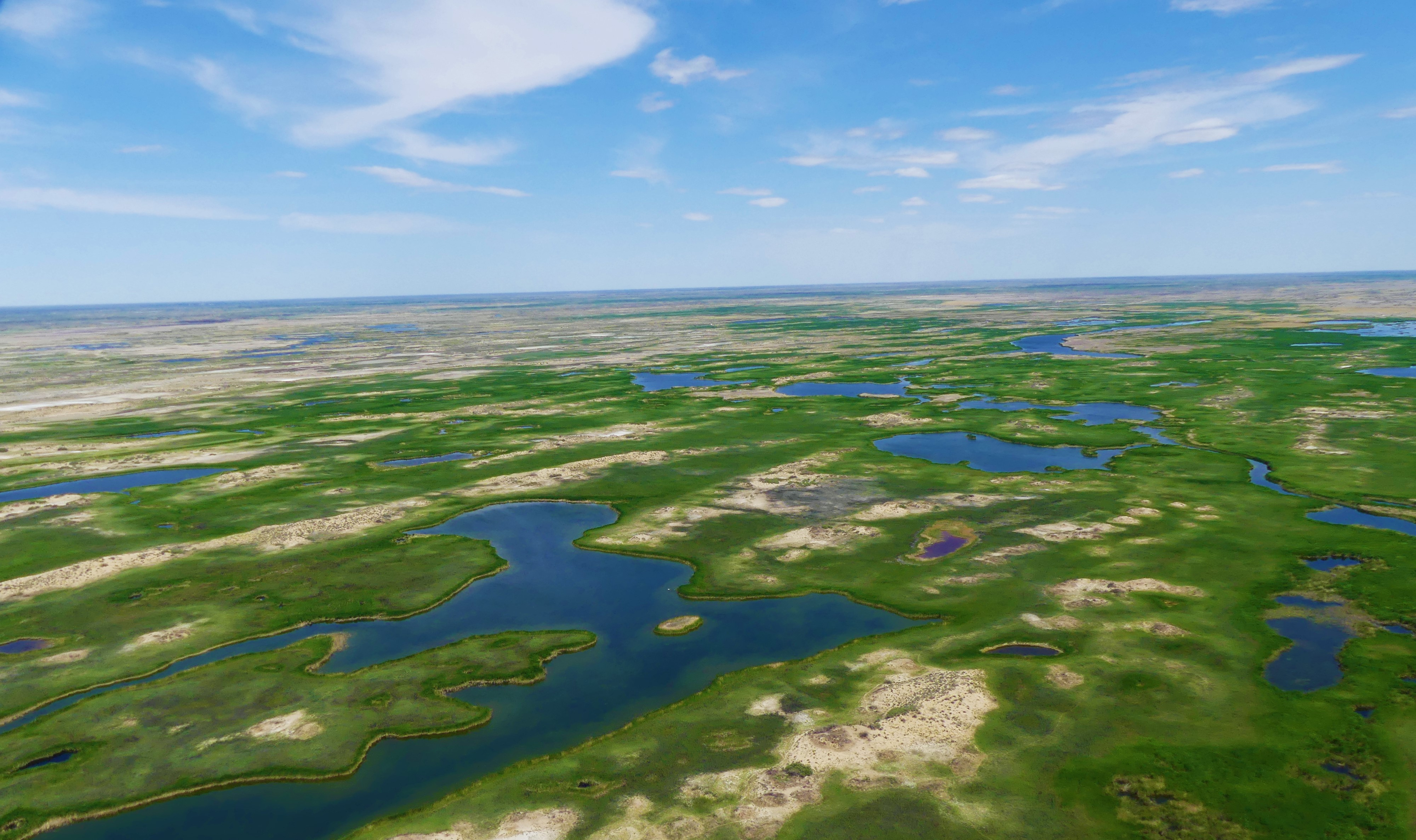
- Interactive map of Ile-Balkhash State Nature Reserve
- Location: Almaty Region, Kazakhstan

Ile-Balkhash State Nature Reserve (Kazakh: «Іле-Балқаш» мемлекеттік табиғи резерваты) is a wildlife conservation area of southeastern Kazakhstan established in 2018. The reserve, in the Almaty Region, lies within the arid and semi-arid Balkhash-Alakol Basin between Lake Balkhash and the Dzungarian Alatau mountains.

== History ==
Established in 2018, the Kazakh government expanded the reserve in 2026 to a total size of 450,253 hectares (4,502 sqkm). In 2026, wildlife biologists introduced Amur tigers to the reserve as part of the Siberian Tiger Introduction Project to replace the now-extinct Caspian tiger that had lived in this region.

== See also ==
- Siberian Tiger Introduction Project
