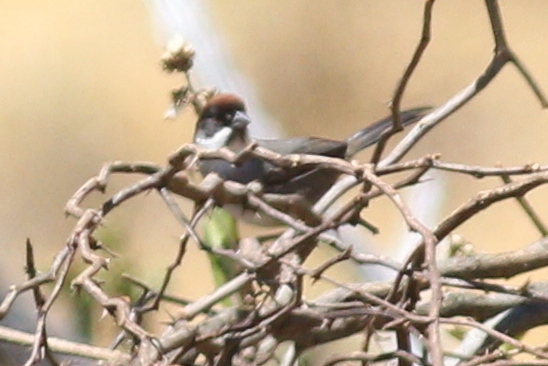

Conservation status
- Least Concern (IUCN 3.1)

Scientific classification
- Kingdom: Animalia
- Phylum: Chordata
- Class: Aves
- Order: Passeriformes
- Family: Passerellidae
- Genus: Atlapetes
- Species: A. seebohmi

Binomial name
- Atlapetes seebohmi (Taczanowski, 1883)
- Global range Year-Round Range

= Bay-crowned brushfinch =

Species of bird

The bay-crowned brushfinch (Atlapetes seebohmi) is a species of bird in the family Passerellidae, the New World sparrows. It is found in Ecuador and Peru.

== Taxonomy and systematics ==
The bay-crowned brushfinch was formally described in 1883 with the binomial Carenochrous seebohmi. The genus Carenochrous was later merged into the present Atlapetes. The specific epithet seebohmi honors Henry Seebohm. Various authors have treated the bay-crowned brushfinch as conspecific with one of the slaty brushfinch (A. schistaceus) or the rusty-bellied brushfinch (A. nationi).

The further taxonomy of the bay-crowned brushfinch is unsettled. The IOC and AviList assign it two subspecies, the nominate A. s. seebohmi (Taczanowski, 1883) and A. s. simonsi (Sharpe, 1900). However, the Clements taxonomy and BirdLife International's Handbook of the Birds of the World add a third subspecies, A. s. celicae (Chapman, 1925), that the other systems include within A. s. simonsi.

This article follows the two-subspecies model.

== Description ==
The bay-crowned brushfinch is 16 to 17 cm (6.3 to 6.7 in) long. The sexes have the same plumage. Adults of the nominate subspecies have a black forehead and a deep rufous crown and nape. Their face is black with a wide white lower cheek and a thin black line below the front of it. Their upperparts are olive-gray; their wings and tail are slightly darker with white on the marginal coverts. Their chin and throat are white with a light gray breastband below them that extends along the flanks and is more olive-gray at the rear. The rest of their breast and their belly are whitish and their crissum buffy. Juveniles have browner upperparts than adults and buffy underparts with faint streaks. Subspecies A. s. simonsi has a rufous forehead, a white spot above the lores, and darker gray upperparts than the nominate. Both subspecies have a dark red-brown iris, a long, thick-based black bill, and grayish legs and feet.

== Distribution and habitat ==
Subspecies A. s. simonsi of the bay-crowned brushfinch is the more northerly of the two. It is found from southern Ecuador's Loja Province south into northern Peru's Tumbes Department. The nominate is found on the Pacific slope of the Andes in Peru from Tumbes south through most of Ancash Department. It inhabits montane scrublands and the undergrowth and edges of montane woodland. In elevation it is found mostly between 1,300 and 2,300 m (4,300 and 7,500 ft) in Ecuador and between 1,150 and 2,800 m (3,800 and 9,200 ft) in Peru.

== Behavior ==
=== Movement ===
The bay-crowned brushfinch is a year-round resident.

=== Feeding ===
The bay-crowned brushfinch's diet has not been studied but is known to include insects, seeds, and fruits. It forages on the ground, where it scratches in leaf litter, or slightly above it in vegetation. It typically forages in pairs or small family groups.

=== Breeding ===
The bay-crowned brushfinch breeds during the rainy season of March to May. Nothing else is known about the species' breeding biology.

=== Vocalization ===
The bay-crowned brushfinch's song is a fast "chew-chew wit-chew or shorter chew-chew’trrrrr". Its main call is "a high-pitched tsiip". When alarmed it makes a repeated "sharp piit or put".

== Status ==
The IUCN has assessed the bay-crowned brushfinch as being of Least Concern. It has a restricted range; its population size is not known but is believed to be stable. No immediate threats have been identified. It is considered "local" in Ecuador, "relatively uncommon" in northern Peru, and "fairly common" in the southern part of its range.
