= Tehran Zoological Garden =

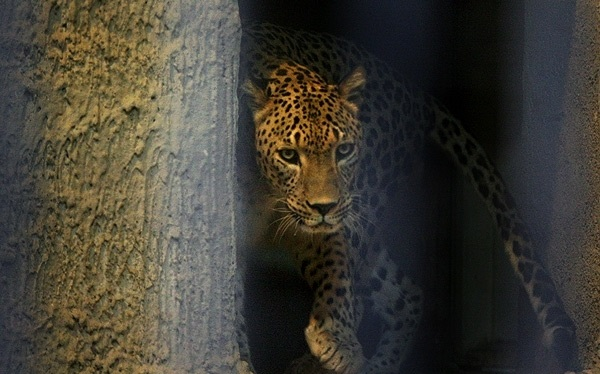
- persian leopard at Eram Zoo
- 35.7185°N 51.2935°E
- Date opened: 1992
- Location: Eram Amusement Park, Tehran, Iran
- Land area: 4.5 ha (11 acres)
- No. of species: Over 290

The Tehran Zoological Garden (Persian: باغ‌وحش تهران), also known as Eram Zoo (باغ‌وحش ارم), is located 4 km (2.5 miles) on the Tehran–Karaj Freeway in the Eram Amusement Park, Tehran province, Iran. Inaugurated in 1992, the zoo covers an area of 4.5 ha (11 acres) and houses over 290 species.

== History ==
In old times of Iran, it was common to have small exhibitions of animals and birds for families in some houses; some times there were exhibitions in some parts of the cities.

In 1637, Adam Olorius, the German traveler had mentioned seeing a zoo in Isfahan (the capital of the Safavid Empire). At Fath-Ali Shah Qajar's era, around 1809, there used to be exhibitions of baboons, apes, snakes, bears and lions in Sabze Meidan, Tehran. Also, there was a permanent exhibition of elephants at elephant house in Darolkhalafeh and the Indian elephants were used in especial occasions. In Qajari era, the first zoo was not established until Naser al-Din Shah Qajar established it at Lakhti Street (Sadi). It was small and few people were visiting it. Later, when Naser al-Din Shah Qajar traveled to Europe he was inspired by the modern zoological gardens. He established the Tehran Zoological Garden at Doshan Tappeh, where there was already a mansion established from 1853 containing a lake using qanat as the water source. It was built for Nasereddin Shah's excursions and a collection of 4 lions from the mountains of Shiraz, 3 tigers from Mazandaran, 3 leopards and a cheetah from Jajrud, 5 bears from Damavand, and striped hyenas, baboons, monkeys, apes, peafowl and predatory birds were kept in the zoo. People could visit the park unless the king was hiking in there. During time, this park was expanding until 1992 that it moved to the current location for medical reasons and renovation.

In 2010, the Iranian government sent a pair of Persian leopards to Russia's Sochi National Park in exchange for two Siberian tigers so that they will eventually release the tigers into the wild in the next five years and start the re-population project. The Miankaleh peninsula was chosen as a suitable habitat for the tigers.

In September 2014, the Tehran Zoological Garden requested to the European Endangered Species Program (EEP) committee to follow the non-EAZA institution for the Asiatic lion. It was said that two lion cubs from a German zoo were on their way for the Tehran zoo. The enclosure for the species had been prepared. However, the letter sent to the Tehran zoo is controversial, and it is disputed that it may be false. Nevertheless, in February 2019, Iran obtained a male named 'Kamran' from Bristol Zoo in the United Kingdom, followed in June by a female named 'Eilda' from Dublin Zoo in Ireland, and lodged them at Tehran Zoo in a bid to reproduce and reintroduce lions in the wilderness.

== Exhibits ==
The Tehran Zoological Garden is the country's largest zoo with 120 animal species from Iran and around the world:

- Cats: African and Asiatic lions, Amur and Bengal tigers, and Persian leopards, Eurasian lynx
- Canids: Wolf, jackal and fox
- Hyenas: Striped hyena
- Primates: chimpanzee, baboon and rhesus macaque
- Bears: Brown bear
- Birds: Crowned crane, peacock, pheasant, pelican, saker falcon, vulture, eagle and penguin.
- Reptiles and amphibians: Python, Iran Plateau short snout crocodile, lizard, iguana and turtle
- Marsupials: Kangaroo
- Rodents: porcupine, Persian squirrel, rabbit and hamster
- Fish: African catfish
- Other: Persian onager, Persian fallow deer, red deer, Bactrian camel, African bush elephant and Sri Lankan elephant
