= Eram Air =

Eram Air هواپیمایی ارم
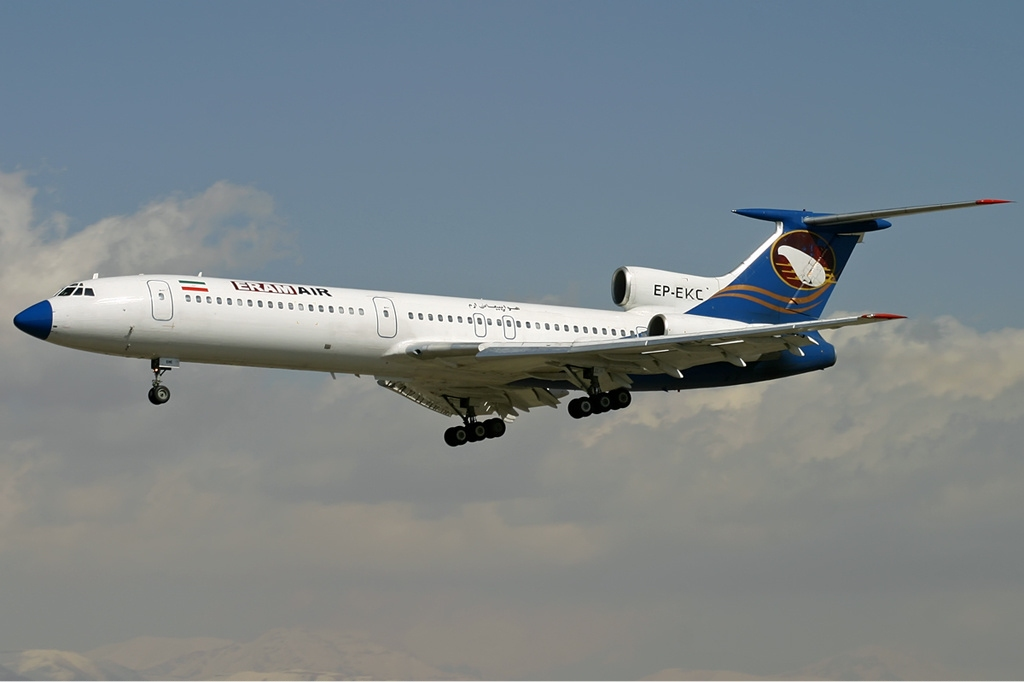
IATA	ICAO	Call sign
YE	IRY	ERAM AIR
- Commenced operations: December 2005
- Ceased operations: 2013
- Hubs: Tabriz International Airport
- Fleet size: 8
- Destinations: 7
- Headquarters: Tabriz, Iran
- Key people: Mohammad Ali Shafiei
- Website: eramair.com

Eram Air (Persian: هواپیمایی ارم, Havâpeymâyi-ye Eram) was an Iranian charter airline based in Tabriz, Iran.

== History ==
It was founded in December 2005 by Mohammad Ali Shafiei, and started operation by 2006. It offered 7 Destinations with a fleet total of 8 aircraft. The airline ceased operation in 2013 due to unknown resources, but mainly because of low ridership. Shafiei announced in 2014 that he has plans to restart Eram air soon, but never released more info.

== Destinations ==
As of 2012, Eram Air offered the following International and domestic destinations.

Country	City	Airport	Notes
Iran	Kish Island	Kish International Airport	
Iran	Mashhad	Mashhad International Airport	
Iran	Tehran	Mehrabad International Airport	
Iran	Tehran	Imam Khomeini International Airport	
Iran	Tabriz	Tabriz International Airport	
Turkey	Istanbul	Istanbul Atatürk International Airport	
Turkey	Izmir	Izmir Adnan Menderes Airport	
Syria	Damacus	Damascus International Airport	

== Fleet ==
The Eram Air fleet consisted of the following aircraft as of June 2012:

Eram Air fleet
Aircraft	In service	Orders	Passengers		Notes
Aircraft	In service	Orders	E	Total	Notes
Tupolev Tu-154M	5	—	95	95	
McDonnell Douglas MD-82	3	—	160	160	on wet lease from the Turkish TT Airlines
