= Eram Amusement Park =

Amusement park in Iran

Coordinates: 35°43′17″N 51°17′34″E

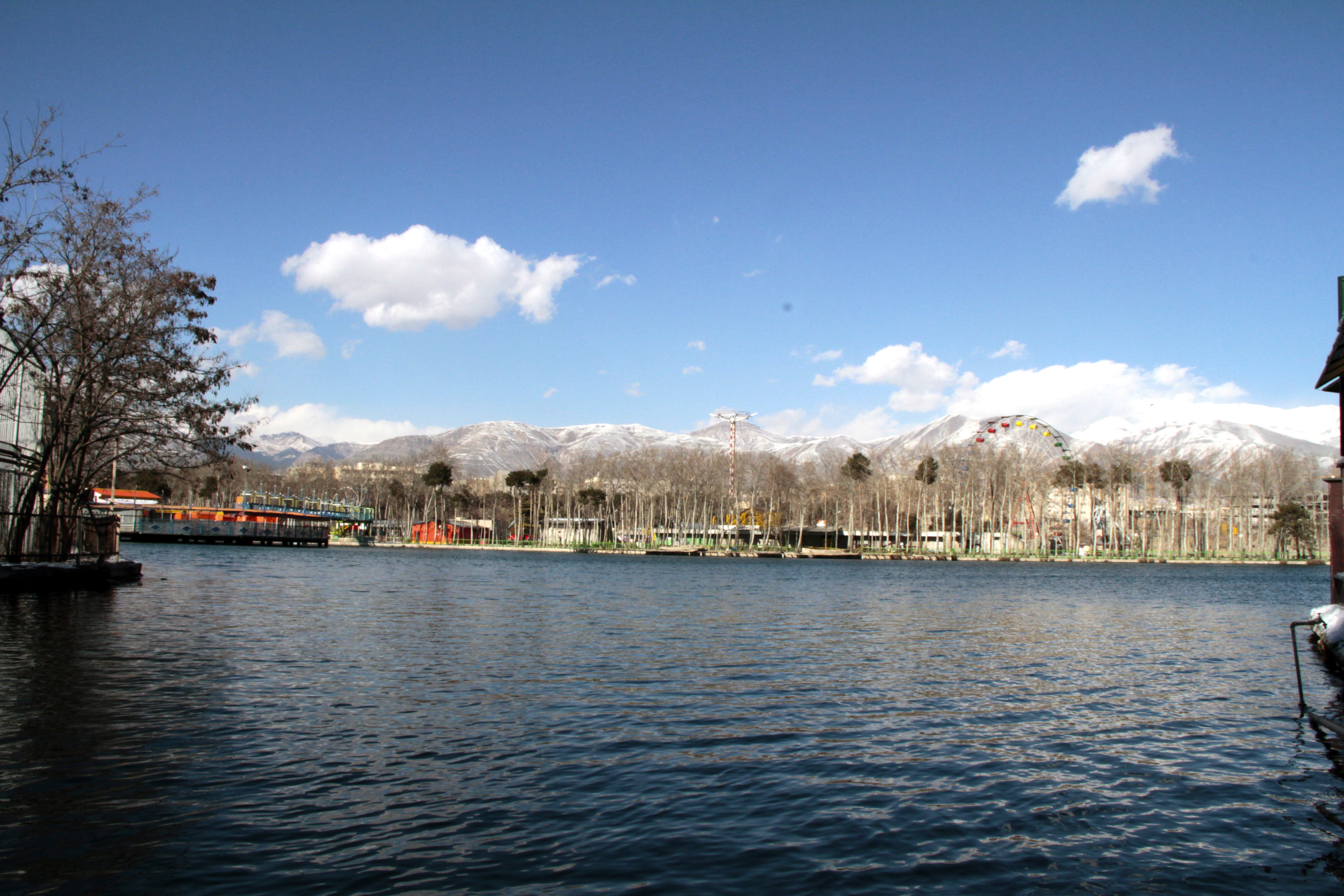
Eram Park lake

Eram Amusement Park پارک ارم, formerly known as Khorram Park, is a theme park in Iran. The park was established in 1972 by Rahimali Khorram, after whom the park was named until 1979.

Eram Park consists of two lunaparks with 28 facilities and more than 120 devices for children and adults, Tehran Zoological Garden with more than 110 species, and an 8-hectare (20-acre) lake for barefoot skiing, cable skiing, canoeing, rowing, and kayaking. It also has various fast food restaurants, cafés, and other restaurants.
