= Henry Seebohm =

English steel manufacturer, amateur ornithologist, oologist and traveller

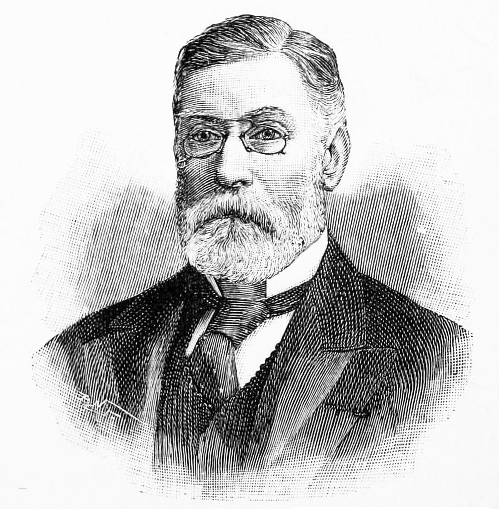
- Born: 12 July 1832
- Died: 26 November 1895 (aged 63)
- Known for: The Birds of Siberia (1901)
- Scientific career
- Fields: Steel manufacture, ornithology, oology
- Institutions: Sheffield
- Author abbrev. (zoology): Seebohm

Henry Seebohm (12 July 1832 – 26 November 1895) was an English steel manufacturer, and amateur ornithologist, oologist and traveller.

== Biography ==
Henry was the oldest son of Benjamin Seebohm (1798–1871) who was a wool merchant at Horton Grange, Bradford. The family had moved to England from Bad Pyrmont in Germany. Henry's mother Esther Wheeler (1798–1864) was a granddaughter of William Tuke. The Seebohms were active in the Society of Friends and Henry schooled within the community in York. He worked initially in a grocery as an assistant but moved to Sheffield where he became a steel manufacturer. He married Maria, daughter of George John Healey, a merchant in Manchester on 19 January 1859.

== Natural history ==
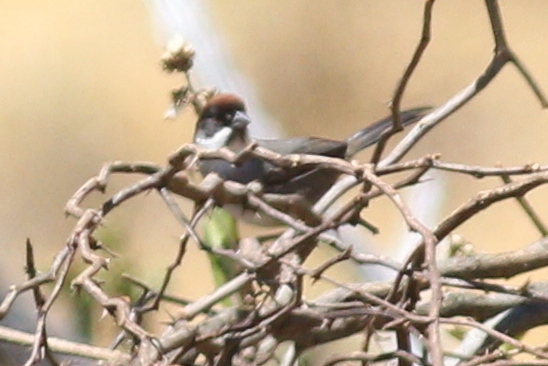
Bay-crowned Brushfinch has its scientific name Atlapetes seebohmi referring to Henry Seebohm.

Henry became interested in natural history at school and continued to spend his spare time studying birds on his journeys. He travelled widely visiting Greece, Scandinavia, Turkey, and South Africa. His expeditions to the Yenisey tundra of Siberia were described in his two books, Siberia in Europe (1880) and Siberia in Asia (1882), which were combined in the posthumous publication The Birds of Siberia (1901). His expeditions included the lower Pechora River in 1875 along with John Alexander Harvie-Brown as well as a visit to Heligoland at the home of Heinrich Gätke. In 1877 he joined Joseph Wiggins to Siberia.

He was one of the first European ornithologists to accept the American trinomial system to classify sub-species.

Seebohm's other publications included A History of British Birds (1883), The Geographical Distribution of the family Charadriidae (1887), The Birds of the Japanese Empire (1890) and A Monograph of the Turdidae (1902, completed by Richard Bowdler Sharpe).

Seebohm bequeathed his collection of bird-skins to the British Museum. The collection which was received in 1896 consisted of nearly 17,000 specimens. A number of birds were named after Seebohm, including the grey emutail (Dromaeocercus seebohmi) by Bowdler Sharpe. A portrait of Seebohm in oil by Hugh Ford Crighton is held by Sheffield Museums.

== Bibliography ==
- (1901) The birds of Siberia; a record of a naturalist's visits to the valleys of the Petchora and Yenesei. J. Murray. London.
- (1893) Geographical distribution of British birds
- (1890) The birds of the Japanese Empire. R.H. Porter, London.
- (1890) Classification of Birds. R.H. Porter, London.
- (1888) The geographical distribution of the family Charadriidae, or, The plovers, sandpipers, snipes, and their allies. H. Sotheran. London
- (1883) A history of British birds, with coloured illustrations of their eggs. R.H. Porter. London. Volume 1 Volume 2 Volume 3 Volume 4
- (1880) Siberia in Europe: a visit to the valley of the Petchora, in north-east Russia. J. Murray, London.
- (1880) Contributions to the ornithology of Siberia
