= Siberian Tiger Introduction Project =

Wildlife conservation project

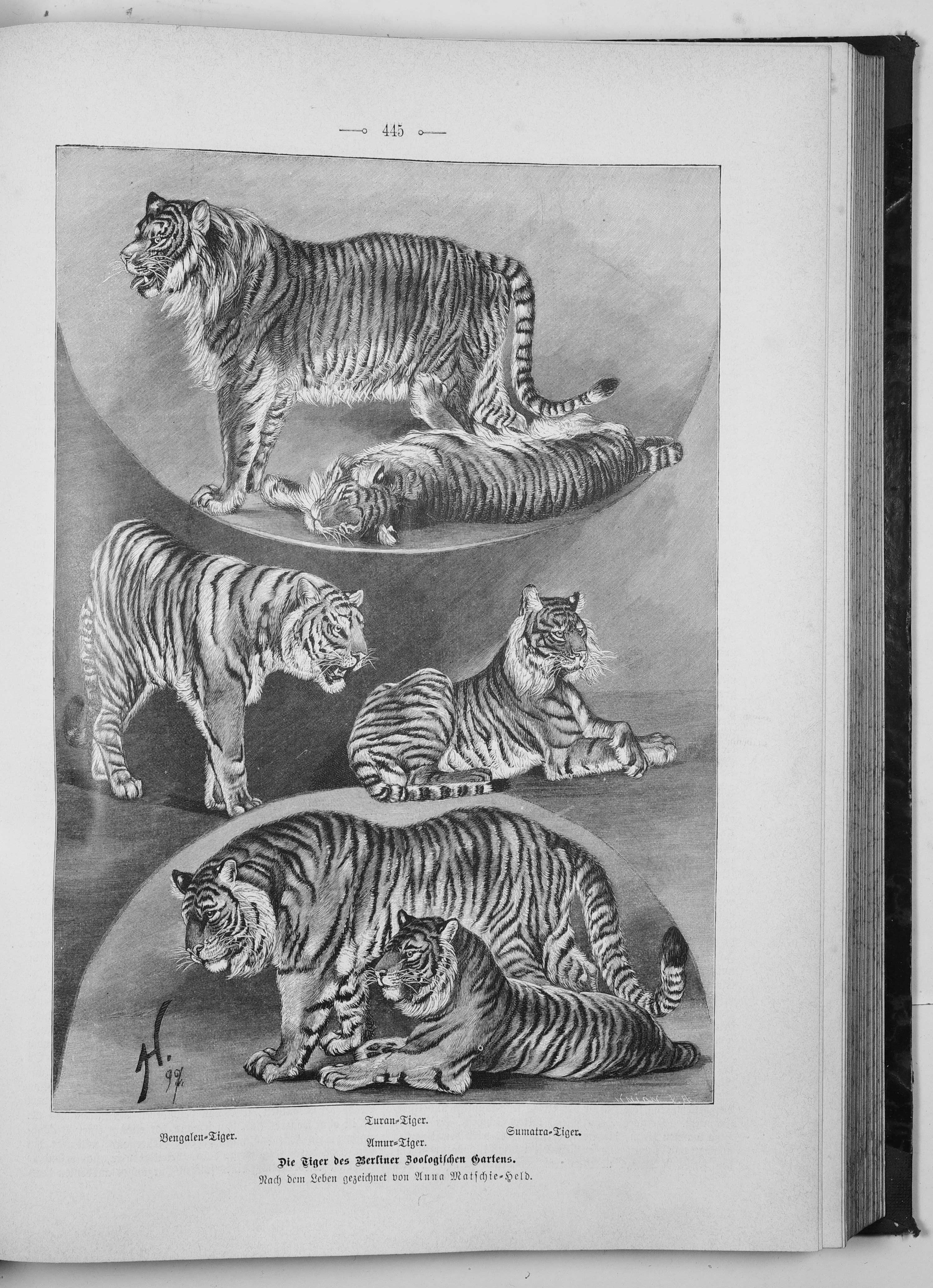
Caspian tiger (top), Bengal tiger (left), Sumatran tiger (right), Siberian tiger (bottom)

The Siberian Tiger Introduction Project involves reintroducing the Siberian tiger in its former range and also expanding its range by translocating it as replacements of its genetically similar relative, the extinct Caspian tiger, which inhabited Central and Western Asia.

== History ==
Genetic studies have revealed that Siberian and Caspian tigers are descended from the tiger population that colonized Central Asia about 10,000 years ago. Siberian tigers used to be common on either side of the Amur River in Russia and China, as well as in northeastern Mongolia and South Korea. Caspian tigers lived around the Caspian Sea in Azerbaijan, Iran and Turkmenistan, and also further away in Armenia, Georgia and Turkey and Kazakhstan all the way to the Altai Mountains in the East. Caspian tigers reportedly became extinct in the 1970s after many years of hunting, poaching and habitat loss. Siberian tigers lost most of their ranges in Siberia and China and became extinct in the wild of Korea and Mongolia.

== Introduction efforts ==
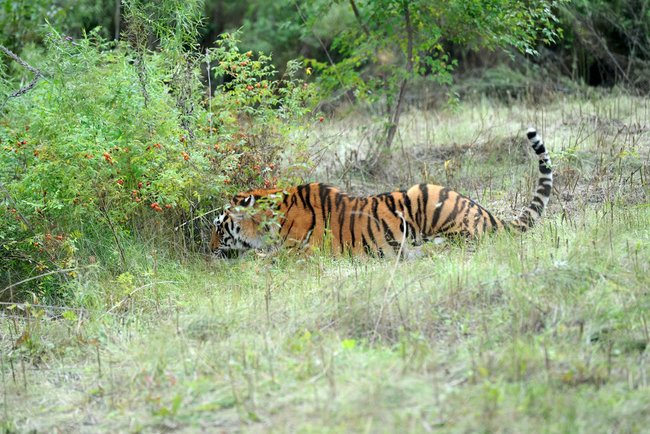
A Siberian tiger at the Rehabilitation Center in the village of Alekseevka, Primorsky Krai, Russia

Introduction projects for Siberian tigers have been proposed for the Middle East, Central Asia and North Asia.

=== Kazakhstan ===
Plans had been made for Siberian tigers be introduced to areas in Kazakhstan where Caspian tigers once lived. A national park tentatively known as Caspian Tiger National Park for introduced tigers was considered to be opened in the near future.

The Amu Darya river delta was suggested as a potential site. A feasibility study was initiated to investigate if the area was suitable, and if such, an initiative would receive support from relevant decision makers. A viable tiger population of about 100 animals would require at least 5,000 km^{2} (1,900 sq mi) of large tracts of contiguous habitat with rich prey populations. Such a habitat is not available at this stage and also cannot be provided in the short term; therefore, the proposed region is unsuitable for introduction.

The southeastern shore of Lake Balkhash where the Ili River discharges and forms a large delta was also chosen as a suitable habitat. Igor Chestin, director of the Russian branch of the World Wide Fund for Nature, had talked on hope to reintroduce tigers into the region, though a need to enlarge the potential prey base by increasing the existing populations of the already established Russian saiga antelope, the Siberian roe deer subspecies Capreolus pygargus tianchanicus, the Central Asian wild boar, and the Turkmen goitered gazelle already living in that area was considered.

In September 2024, two Siberian tigers were brought from a big cat sanctuary in the Netherlands and placed into a semi-wild enclosure so that, should they reproduce, their offspring could be released into the wild upon reaching maturity. The goal is to get a healthy population of 50 tigers in the wilds of the Ile-Balkhash State Nature Reserve by 2035. On 31 July 2026, a female Amur tiger was released into the reserve, and three other individuals are still under observational review for later release. This marked the first wild tiger in Central Asia in over 70 years. A male tiger was then released into the reserve on 31 October 2026.

=== Iran ===
Siberian tigers might be introduced to areas in northern Iran where Caspian tigers once lived. In 2010, a pair of Siberian tigers sent by Russia to Iran's Tehran Zoological Garden (Eram Zoo) in exchange for a pair of Persian leopards were set to be introduced to the Miankaleh peninsula along the southeasternmost shore of the Caspian Sea within the next five years.

In December 2010, one of the Siberian tigers at the Eram Zoo died due to a feline immunodeficiency virus (FIV) infection. In 2011, Iran requested four more Siberian tigers and invited conservation experts from Russia to support the introduction project for the Caspian Sea coast. Iran received two pairs of Siberian tigers in 2012.

=== Siberia ===
A 3-year-old male tiger, which was captured in a prey-depleted area, is released back into the wild

The future introduction of Siberian tigers is planned as part of the ambitious rewilding project at Pleistocene Park in the Kolyma river basin in northern Yakutia, Russia, provided the population of herbivores such as muskox, Yakutian horse, and reindeer reach a size capable of supporting large predators.

=== Korea ===
North Korea was urged to join Russia and China in saving the Siberian tiger after the latest census revealed that only 562 individuals live in the wild. According to the director of the Amur branch of the WWF, analysis of satellite imagery of North Korea has shown that the northern part of the country has suitable conditions for releasing Siberian tigers. This is supported by the fact that a tigress with two cubs had once crossed the border between Russia and North Korea.
