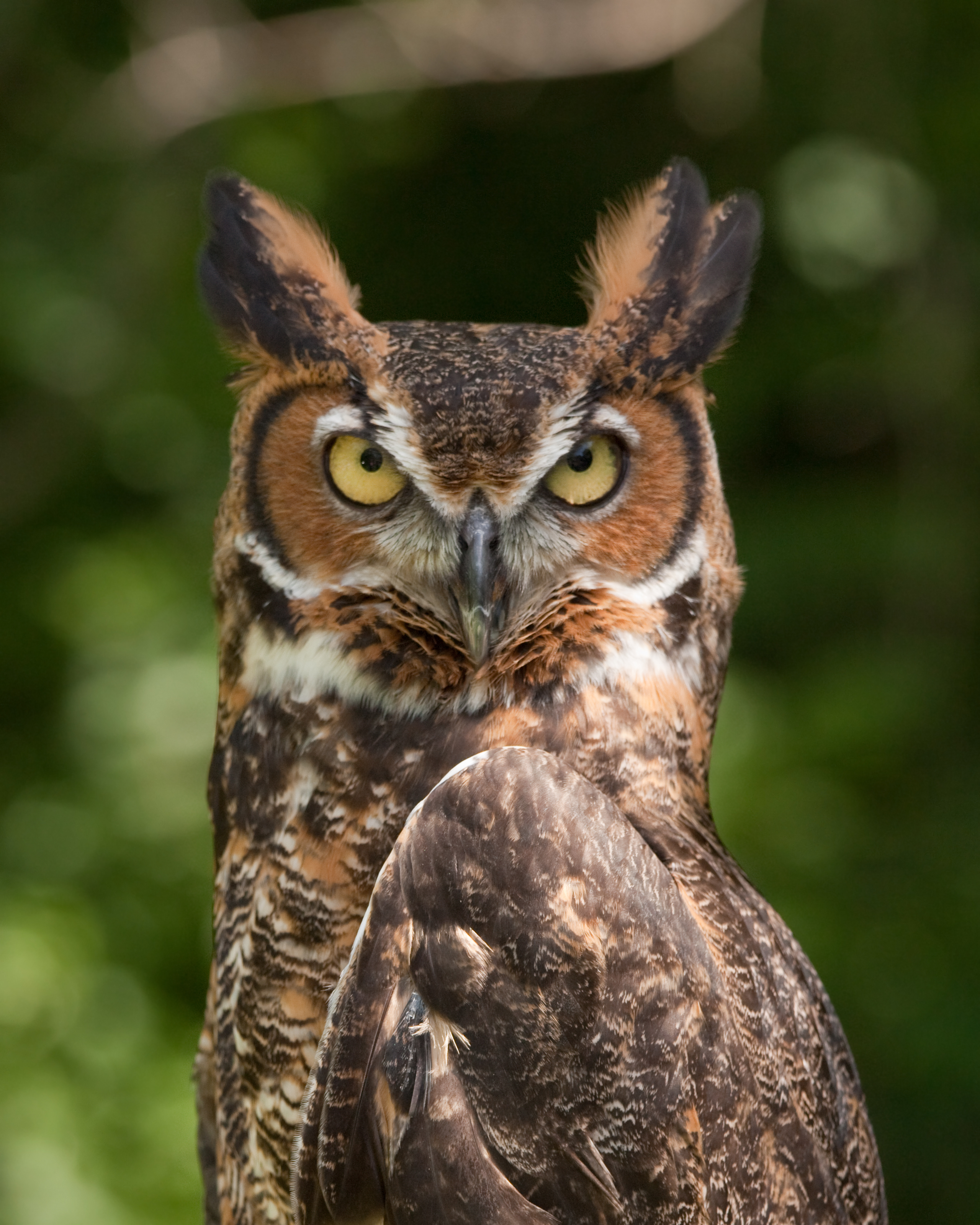
- Common great horned owl; B. v. virginianus
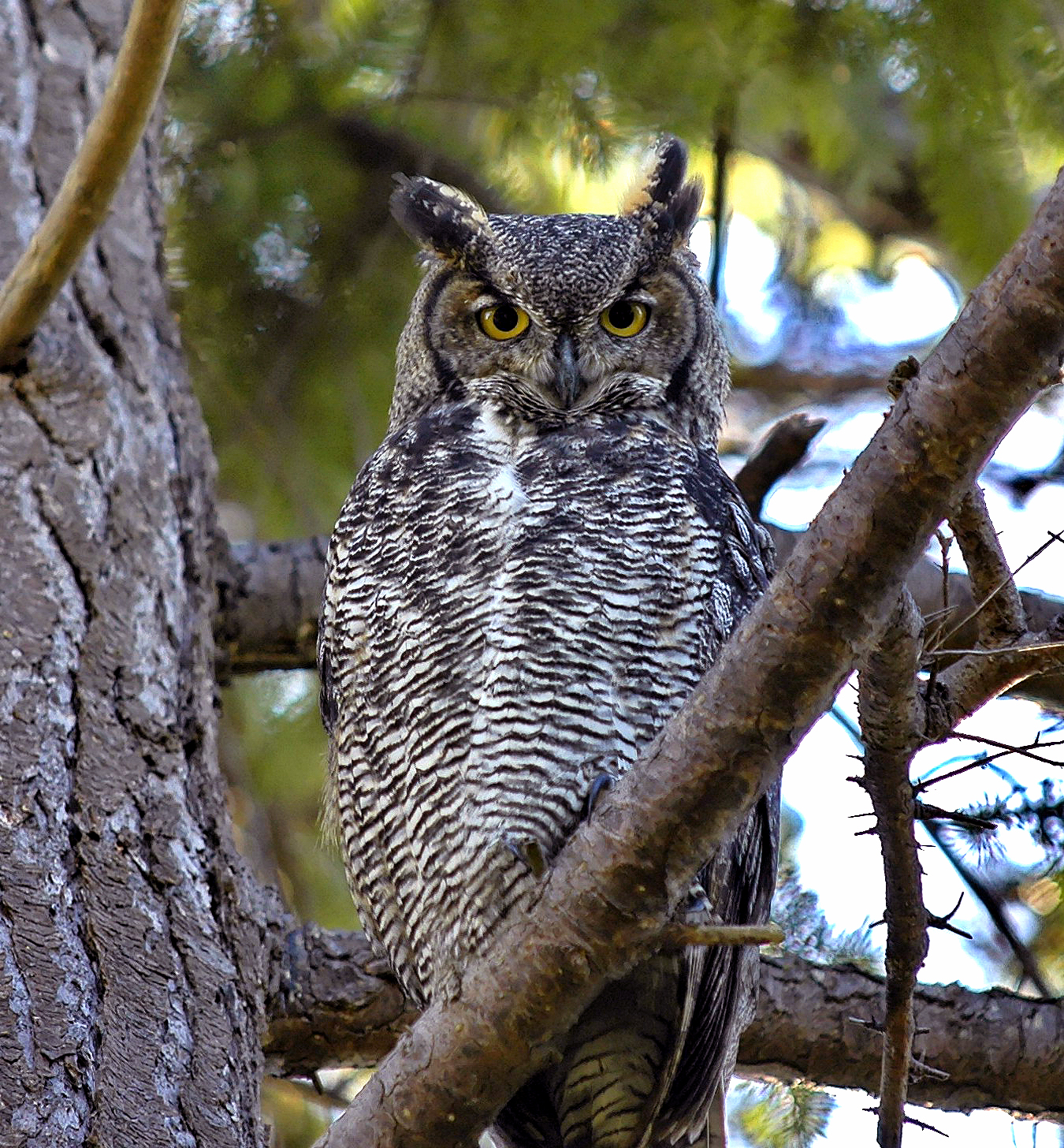
- Coastal great horned owl; B. v. saturatus; Reifel Migratory Bird Sanctuary, Delta, British Columbia, Canada

Conservation status
- Least Concern (IUCN 3.1)
- CITES Appendix II

Scientific classification
- Kingdom: Animalia
- Phylum: Chordata
- Class: Aves
- Order: Strigiformes
- Family: Strigidae
- Genus: Bubo
- Species: B. virginianus

Binomial name
- Bubo virginianus (Gmelin, 1788)

Subspecies
- About 12, see text
- Range

Synonyms
- Strix virginiana Gmelin, 1788; and see text

= Great horned owl =

Great horned owl Temporal range: Pleistocene–present

Species of owl

The great horned owl (Bubo virginianus), also known as the tiger owl (originally derived from early naturalists' description as the "winged tiger" or "tiger of the air") or the hoot owl, is a large owl native to the Americas. It is an extremely adaptable bird with a vast range and is the most widely distributed true owl in North America. Its diet consists primarily of rabbits and hares, rats and mice, and voles; it remains one of the few regular predators of skunk. Hunting also includes rodents, larger mid-sized mammals, birds, reptiles, amphibians, and invertebrates.

In ornithological study, the great horned owl is often compared to the Eurasian eagle-owl (Bubo bubo), a closely related species, which occupies the same ecological niche in Eurasia despite its notably larger size. The great horned owl is also compared to the red-tailed hawk (Buteo jamaicensis), with which it often shares similar habitat, prey, and nesting habits by day; thus the red-tailed hawk is something of a diurnal ecological equivalent. The great horned owl is one of the earliest nesting birds in North America, often laying eggs weeks or even months before other raptorial birds.

== Taxonomy ==
The great horned owl was formally described in 1788 by the German naturalist Johann Friedrich Gmelin in his revised and expanded edition of Carl Linnaeus's Systema Naturae. He placed it with the other owls in the genus Strix and coined the binomial name Strix virginia. Gmelin based his description on that of English naturalist George Edwards who had described and illustrated the great horned owl in 1747 in the second volume of his A Natural History of Uncommon Birds. Edwards had seen a live specimen from Virginia at the house of the Earl of Burlington in Chiswick. Edwards also owned a preserved specimen, and another specimen formed part of the Leverian collection. The great horned owl is now placed in the genus Bubo that was introduced in 1805 by André Duméril.

The great horned owl represents one of the one or two radiations of the genus across the Bering land bridge to the Americas. Whereas the Magellanic horned owl clearly divided once the owl had spread through the Americas, the consensus seems to be that the snowy owl and the great horned owl divided back in Eurasia and the snowy then spread back over the Arctic through northernmost North America separately from the radiation of the greater and Magellanic horned owls. One older study suggested that great horned and Eurasian eagle-owls may be conspecific, based on similarities in life history, geographic distribution, and appearance, though this is not supported by genetic evidence, which places them in separate clades of their genus. Genetic testing indicates that the Magellanic horned owl, and then the snowy owl, not the Eurasian eagle-owl, are the most closely related living species. Pleistocene era fossils have been found of Bubo owls in North America, which may either be distinct species or paleosubspecies, from as far east as Georgia, but predominantly in the Rocky Mountains and to the west of them. Almost all fossils indicate these owls were larger than modern great horned owls.

A large number of subspecies, more than 20 altogether, have been named. However, many of these are not true subspecies and only examples of individual or clinal variation. Subspecies differences are mainly in color and size and generally follow Gloger's and Bergmann's rules: The most conservative treatments of great horned owl subspecies may describe as few as 10, although an intermediate number is typical in most writings.

Twelve subspecies are recognised:

- B. v. algistus (Oberholser, 1904) – coast of western Alaska (Kotzebue Sound southward to Bristol Bay)
- B. v. lagophonus (Oberholser, 1904) – central Alaska to northeastern Oregon and Montana; winters to Texas
- B. v. saturatus Ridgway, 1877 – coastal southwestern Alaska (Cook Inlet) to coastal central California
- B. v. pacificus Cassin, 1854 – coastal California to northwestern Baja California
- B. v. subarcticus Hoy, 1853 – northwestern British Columbia to Hudson Bay, Wyoming, and North Dakota
- B. v. pallescens Stone, 1897 – desert of central and southeastern California to Kansas and southern Mexico (Oaxaca)
- B. v. pinorum Dickerman & Johnson, 2008 – Great Basin and Rocky Mountains in western USA, from northeastern California and southern Idaho southward to northeastern Arizona, northern New Mexico, and western Texas (Guadalupe Mountains)
- B. v. heterocnemis (Oberholser, 1904) – northeastern Canada southward to Great Lakes region
- B. v. virginianus (Gmelin, 1788) – Minnesota to Nova Scotia, southward to Kansas, eastern Texas, and Florida
- B. v. elachistus Brewster, 1902 – southern Baja California and Isla Espírito Santo
- B. v. mayensis Nelson, 1901 – southeastern Mexico (Yucatán Peninsula)
- B. v. mesembrinus (Oberholser, 1904) – southern Mexico (Isthmus of Tehuantepec) to northwestern Nicaragua

In 2026, the American Ornithological Society adopted a proposal to split the great horned owl into four species based on recent data highlighting the distinct behavioral and genetic differences between populations. Three South American populations of great horned owls were elevated to species status, while northern populations remained within Bubo virginianus. Other taxonomic authorities such as AviList would adopt the split as well.

The three newly recognized species include:

- Paramo horned owl, Bubo nigrescens – northern Andes mountains
- Tropical horned owl, Bubo nacurutu – tropical South America
- Magellanic horned owl, Bubo magellanicus – southern South America to the central Andes mountains

== Description ==
The great horned owl is generally colored for camouflage. The underparts of the species are usually light with some brown horizontal barring; the upper parts and upper wings are generally a mottled brown usually bearing heavy, complex, darker markings. All subspecies are darkly barred to some extent along the sides.

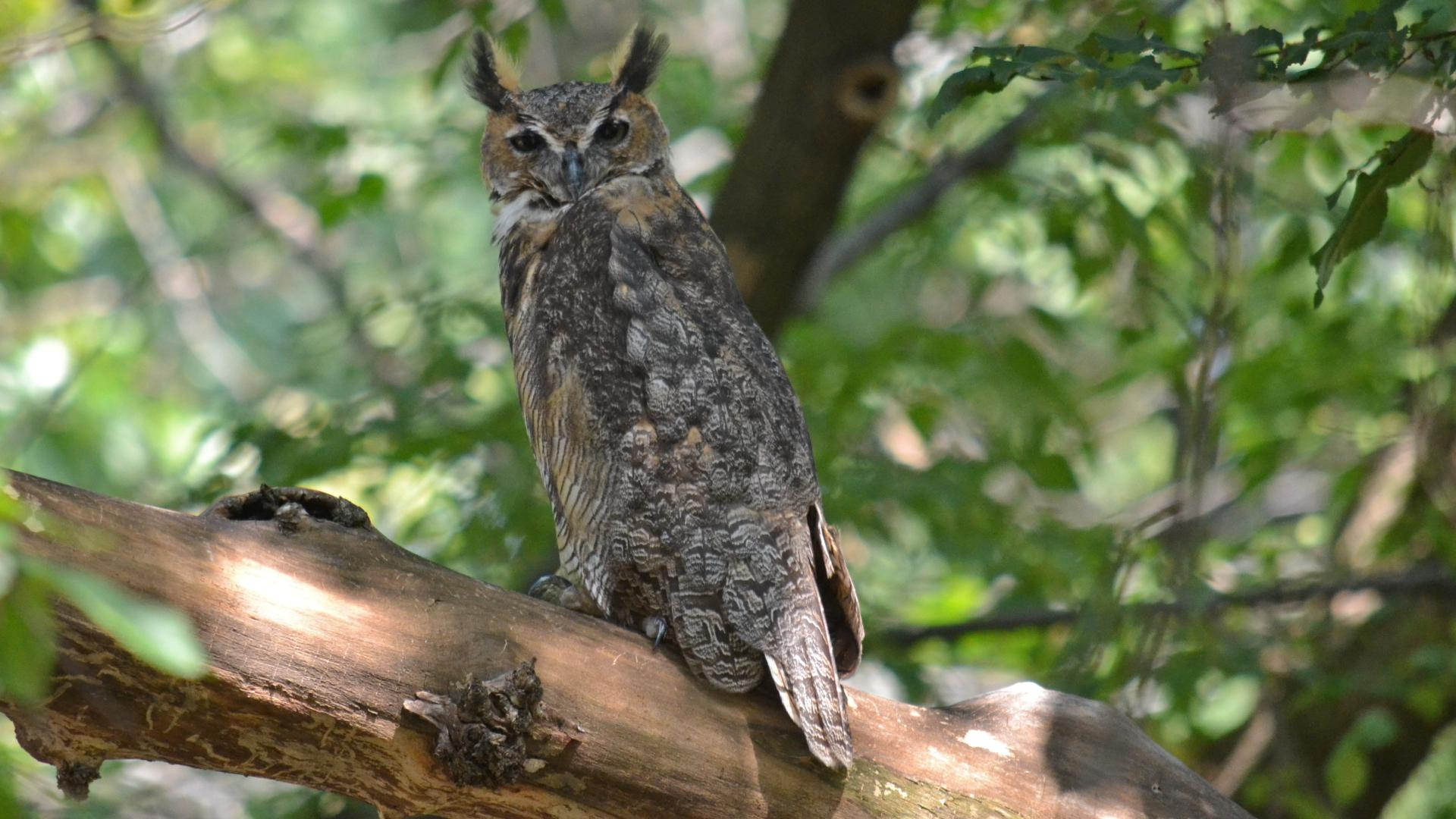
Great horned owl showing much of its camouflage pattern/color

A variable-sized white patch is seen on the throat. The white throat may continue as a streak running down the middle of the breast even when the birds are not displaying, which in particularly pale individuals can widen at the belly into a large white area.

Individual and regional variations in overall color occur, with birds from the subarctic showing a washed-out, light-buff color, while those from the Pacific Coast of North America and Central America can be a dark brownish color overlaid with blackish blotching. The skin of the feet and legs, though almost entirely obscured by feathers, is black. Even tropical great horned owls have feathered legs and feet. The feathers on the feet of the great horned owl are the second-longest known in any owl (after the snowy owl). The bill is dark gunmetal-gray, as are the talons.

All great horned owls have a facial disc. This can be reddish, brown, or gray in color (depending on geographical and racial variation) and is demarked by a dark rim culminating in bold, blackish side brackets. This species' eyebrow-like "horns" are tufts of feathers, called plumicorns. The purpose of plumicorns is not fully understood, but the hypothesis that they serve as a visual cue in territorial and sociosexual interactions with other owls is generally accepted.

=== Physiology and measurements ===
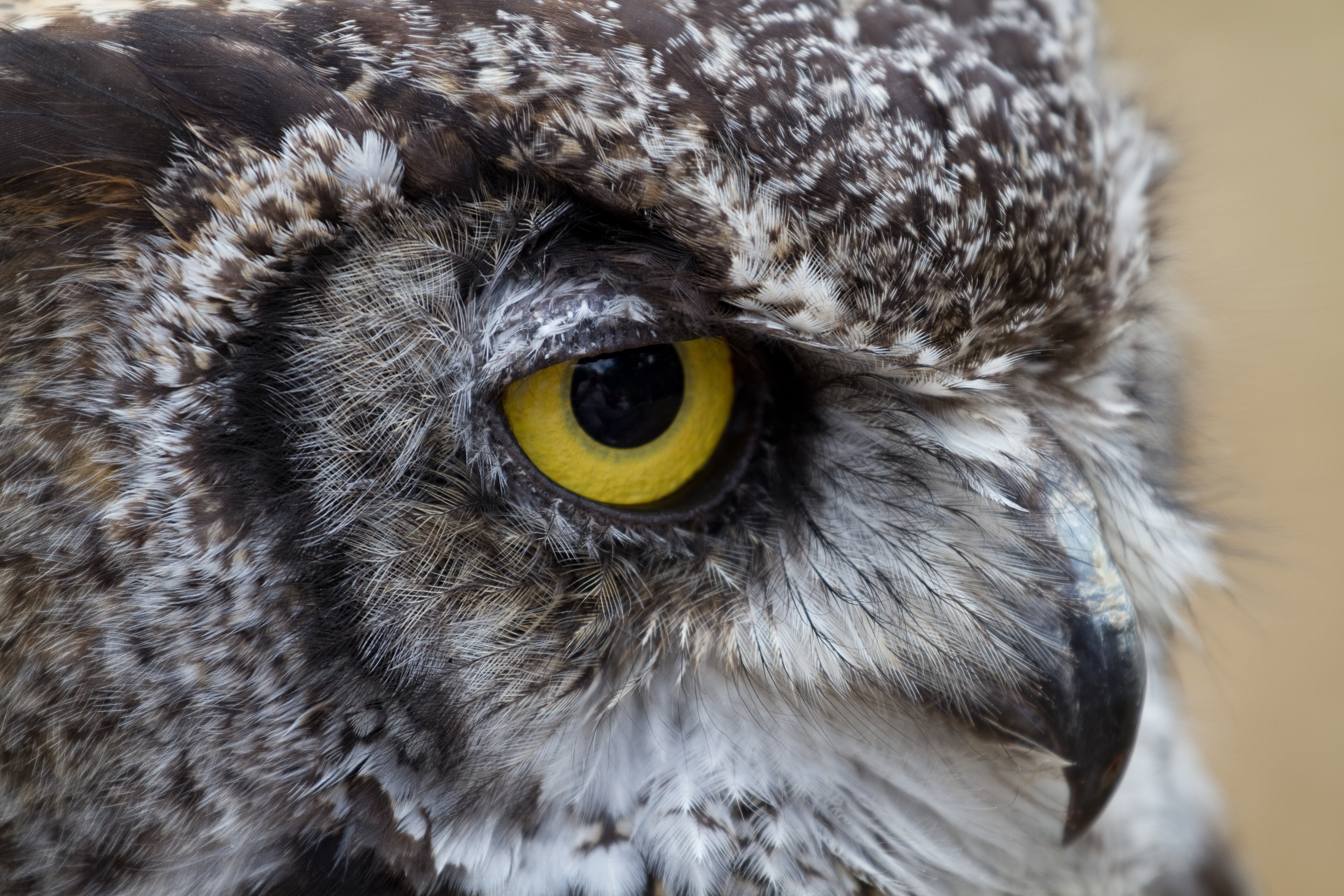
The eyes of great horned owls are among the proportionally largest of terrestrial vertebrates.

The great horned owl is the heaviest extant owl in Central America and is the second-heaviest owl in North America, after the closely related but very different-looking snowy owl. It is heavily built, with a barrel-shaped body, a large head, and broad wings. Its size can vary considerably across its range, with populations in interior Alaska and Ontario being largest and populations in California and Texas being smallest, though those from the Yucatán Peninsula and Baja California appear to be even smaller. Adult great horned owls range in length from 43 to 64 cm (17 to 25 in), with an average of 55 cm (22 in), and possess a wingspan of 91 to 153 cm (3 ft 0 in to 5 ft 0 in), with an average of 122 cm (48 in). Females are somewhat larger than males. Mean body weight is 1,608 g (3.545 lb) for females and 1,224 g (2.698 lb) for males. Depending on subspecies, maximum weight can reach 2,503 g (5.518 lb).

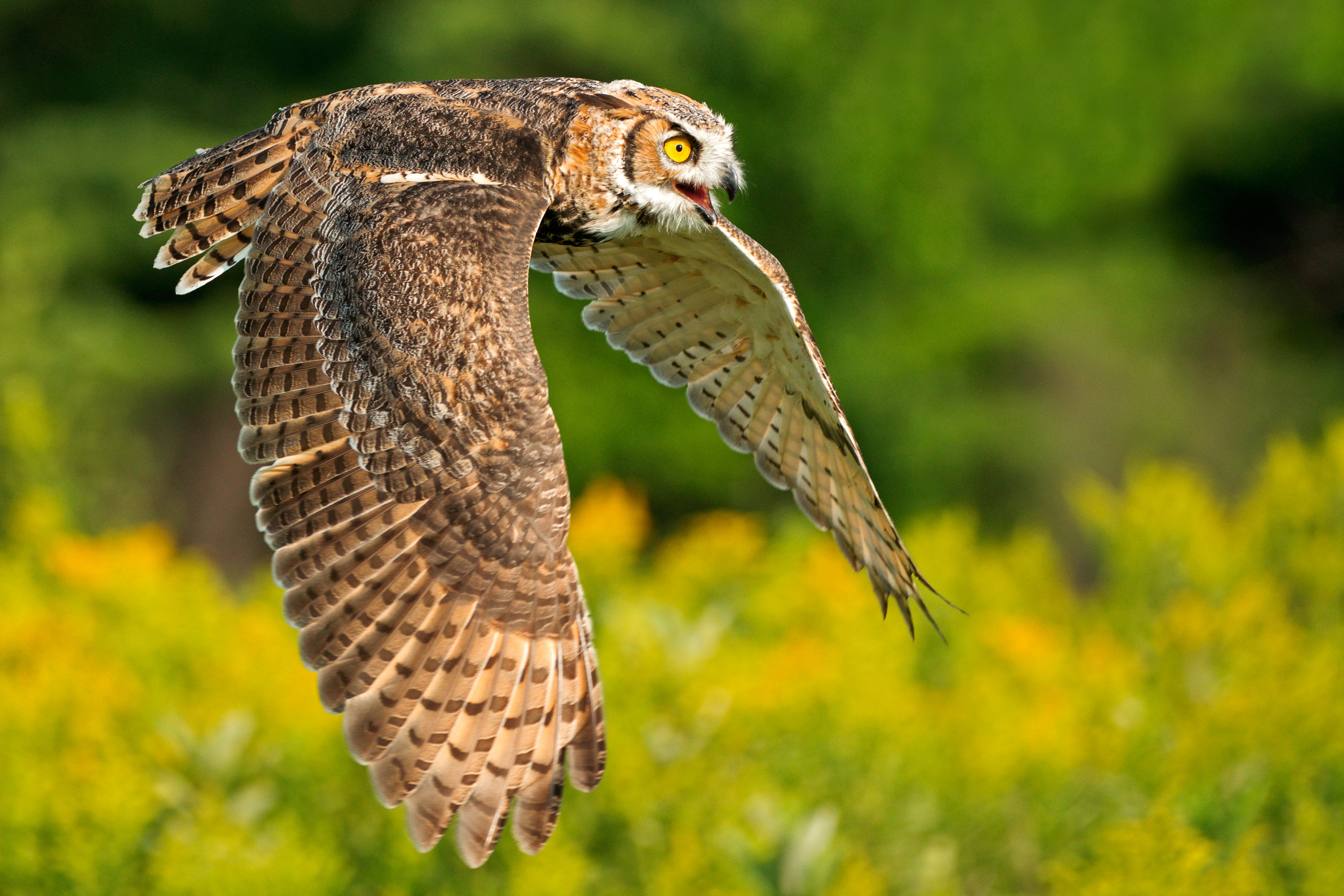
Great horned owl wing

The wing chord length is 297–400 mm (11.7–15.7 in). The wing loading, the measured wing area compared to weight, is high, meaning the wings are relatively small in surface area for the bird's weight; the species' wing loading has been described as proportionately the highest among raptors. The tail, being relatively short as is typical of most owls, is 175 to 252 mm (6.9 to 9.9 in) long. Like other owl species, the great horned owl is capable of "silent flight", which is the way owls fly while making almost no discernable noise, despite their large size. This is made possible thanks to three main components of the owl's wing structure. The leading edge of their feathers have serrations that help to disrupt the turbulence generated by wing flapping, then the softer feathers help deaden the sound, and finally the trailing fringe of the feathers works to finish cutting the sounds made by flight. The structure of the great horned owl wing also allows it to fly at a very low speed for the size of the species, as slow as 2 miles per hour when they are gliding on breezes.

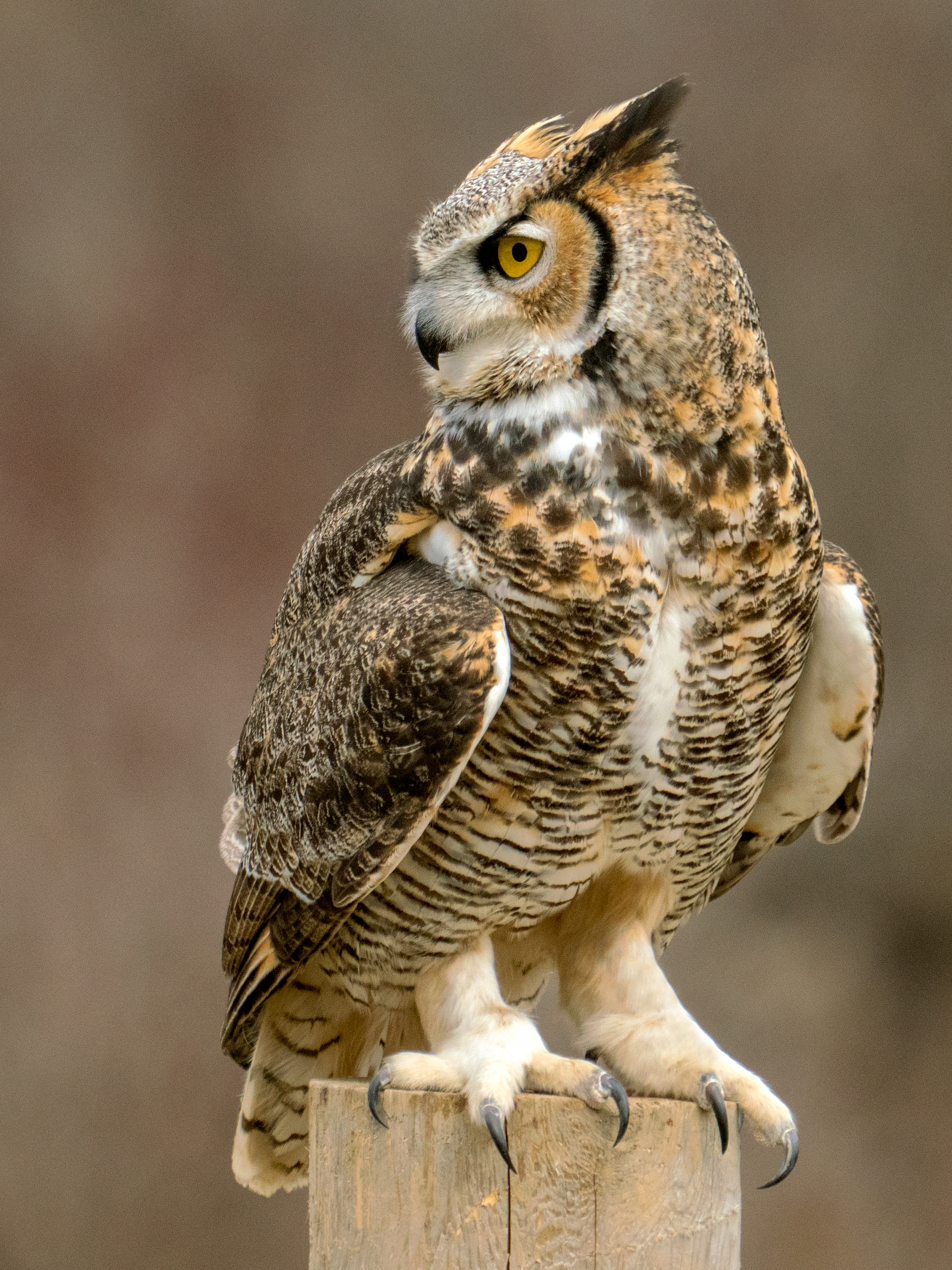
Great horned owl (Canada)

The legs, feet, and talons are large and powerful. Tarsal length is 54–80 mm (2.1–3.1 in). The average foot span of a fully spread foot, from talon to talon, is around 20 cm (7.9 in), as compared to 8 cm (3.1 in) in long-eared owls, 13 to 15 cm (5.1 to 5.9 in) in barn owls, and 18 cm (7.1 in) in the great grey owl. Great horned owls can apply at least 300 psi (2,100 kPa) of crushing power in their talons, a pressure considerably greater than the human hand is capable of exerting. In some big females, the gripping power of the great horned owl may be comparable to much larger raptor species such as the golden eagle.

The hard, inflexible bill of the great horned owl is 3.3–5.2 cm (1.3–2.0 in) long, although the culmen, the exposed bill portion as measured along the top of the beak, is only 2.1 to 3.3 cm (0.83 to 1.30 in).

The outer ear openings, which are concealed by feathers on the sides of the head, are relatively smaller than those of the Eurasian eagle owl, being 2.3 cm (0.91 in) in vertical axis, with the left ear slightly larger than the right. Like most exclusively (or near exclusively) nocturnal species, the great horned owl has asymmetrical ear holes that allow for the triangulation of sounds when hunting in the dark. The different-height holes, while still close together, are differentiated enough that the owl is able to use the timing and direction of the sound waves hitting each hole to precisely locate prey even if the prey is located under cover such as snow. The disc-like shape of their faces also helps to direct the sounds they hear toward their ears. While the true nature/purpose of the ear tufts that are present on the great horned owl is unknown, researchers agree that the tufts do not play any role in the hearing ability of the owl. It is estimated that their hearing is up to ten times that of a human being.

The great horned owl's eyes, just slightly smaller than the eyes of a human being, are large even for an owl and rank proportionately among the largest eyes of all terrestrial vertebrates. The great horned owl has cylindrical eyes, which creates more distance from the lens of the eye to the retina, which allows it to act more like a telephoto lens for farther distance sight compared to that possible from round eyes. They are visually highly adapted for nocturnal hunting and provide a wide, almost completely binocular field of view, a large corneal surface, and a predominantly rod retina.

The great horned owl's eye contains both rods and cones, like most species that see in color, but the vision of a great horned owl closely resembles that of many other nocturnal species. The peak wavelengths that are observed by the cones is 555 nm, and the research suggests that the great horned owl has relatively weak color vision, especially compared to other bird species. Despite (or perhaps as a result of) the poorer sense of color vision, the owl manages to have excellent night vision. Instead of turning its eyes, an owl must turn its whole head, and the great horned owl can rotate its neck 270°. The iris is yellow.

=== Calls ===
The great horned owl's song is normally a low-pitched but loud ho-ho-hoo hoo hoo (or also transcribed as bu-bubu booh, who-hoo-ho-oo or who-ho-o-o, whoo-hoo-o-o, whoo) and can last for four or five syllables. The call is resonant and has warranted descriptions as varied as "solemn" and "terrifying". The female's call is higher and rises in pitch at the end of the call. Female vocalizations are higher in pitch because of a smaller syrinx in the larger sex. Calling seems to peak after rather than before midnight. Usually, territorial hooting decreases in February or March at the onset of egg laying.

On occasion, this species exhibits "an indescribable assemblage of hoots, chuckles, screeches, and squawks, given so rapidly and disconnectedly that the effect is both startling and amusing". Descriptions of some of these odd sounds including a growling krrooo-ooo note pair, a laughing whar, whah, wha-a-a-a-ah, a high-pitched ank, ank, ank; a weak, soft erk, erk, a cat-like meee-owwwwww, a hawk-like note of ke-yah, ke-yah, and a nighthawk-like peent. These vocalizations may be variously uttered when the birds are disturbed and angered at the nest (frequently preceding an attack on an interloping human or other animal), represent the vocal development of young owls, or are given during courtship and during territorial disputes with other owls. Young owls still in the care of their parents make loud, persistent hissing or loud, piercing screeching sounds that are often confused with the calls of the barn owl.

=== Subspecies ===
Common/eastern great horned owl (Bubo virginianus virginianus)

Eastern United States eastwards from at least as far west as Minnesota to Texas; northeastwards in distribution to southern Quebec, southern Ontario, Nova Scotia and Prince Edward Island. Resident all-year. The race B. v. mesembrinus from Central America south of the Isthmus of Tehuantepec, may be merely a southerly leg of this race, as its coloring is almost exactly the same as virginianus, although with rather smaller body size. However, mesembrinus type owls are discontinuous in range, with only paler owls from pallescens and mayensis found in the in-between range before the northern virginianus reappears back up in South Texas.
The "nominate race" is a medium-hued form, neither darkly saturated nor strikingly pale. Darker gray or somewhat paler individuals are known. It tends to be richly tinged with rufous and barred distinctly blackish-brown below with rather soft contrast. The feet can range from tawny to buff to creamy and are the legs are typically barred dark to a moderate extent. The facial disc is often a solid cinnamon-red color. This is mid-to-large race, with a wing chord length of 319–371 mm (12.6–14.6 in), averaging 339 mm (13.3 in), in males and 343–388 mm (13.5–15.3 in), averaging 362.8 mm (14.28 in), in females. Unexpectedly, although it is not the longest-winged, the nominate is the heaviest known race as males weigh from 985 to 1,588 g (2.172 to 3.501 lb), averaging 1,318 g (2.906 lb), and females weigh from 1,417 to 2,503 g (3.124 to 5.518 lb), averaging 1,768.5 g (3.899 lb); the prior figures originally from a huge sample around Michigan. In comparison, B. v. subarcticus, though averaging longer in wing length averages somewhat less heavy. On the contrary, in Costa Rica, within the range of the possibly synonymous mesembrinus, great horned owls average approximately 1,000 g (2.2 lb), the lightest average mass reported anywhere for this species. Other standard measurements of this race are a tail length of 190 to 235 mm (7.5 to 9.3 in), a tarsus length of about 56 to 58 mm (2.2 to 2.3 in) and a bill length of 35 to 50 mm (1.4 to 2.0 in). B. v. virginianus also tends to have relatively the longest ear tufts on any race.

Northern/sub-Arctic great horned owl (Bubo virginianus subarcticus)

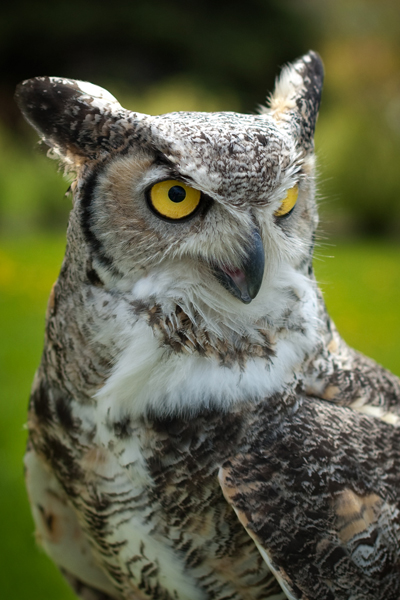
Northern great horned owl (B. v. subarcticus) in Manitoba

Breeding range from Mackenzie, British Columbia region east to the southern Hudson Bay; southern limit unclear but at least reaches to Montana and North Dakota. Non-breeding birds are regularly found south to latitude 45°S, i.e. Wyoming or South Dakota, occasionally ranging beyond this limit especially in years with low prey in the north. This race includes the birds described as occidentalis (based on a wintering individual, as was the original subarcticus) and sclariventris. The older name wapacuthu was occasionally used for this subspecies, but it cannot with certainty be assigned to a recognizable taxon and is thus considered a nomen dubium. The population described as algistus is probably based on wandering individuals and/or various intergrades of subarcticus with other races.
This is the palest form of horned owl, with the ground color essentially whitish with a faint buff tinge above; black underside barring variable from indistinct to pronounced, being most often prominent on the upper chest amongst otherwise pale plumage. This race shows little to no reddish coloration. B. v. subarcticus shows a very high degree of clinal variation, ranging from in the Contiguous United States where owls are often medium-grayish and more heavily marked to the subarctic zone in Canada where very pale birds with almost non-existent markings are prominent. Very pale birds are similar to a young female snowy owl from a distance. In this race, the feet range from immaculate white to buff, with little or no mottling. In the west of Canada, subarcticus may hybridize with the dark saturatus and may do the same with this similarly dark heterocnemis in the east. In both cases, they may produce intermediate looking hybrids of reddish tone, like a virginianus but with sharper contrasting of colors. This is one of the largest-bodied subspecies. The wing chord length is 323–372 mm (12.7–14.6 in), averaging 346.7 mm (13.65 in), in males and 339–390 mm (13.3–15.4 in), averaging 362.5 mm (14.27 in), in females. Body mass ranges from 865 to 1,460 g (1.907 to 3.219 lb), averaging 1,196.5 g (2.638 lb), in males and from 1,112 to 2,046 g (2.452 to 4.511 lb), averaging 1,556 g (3.430 lb), in females. Tail length is 200 to 225 mm (7.9 to 8.9 in) and 220 to 240 mm (8.7 to 9.4 in) in males and females, respectively. Bill length is 35 to 43 mm (1.4 to 1.7 in) in both and one bird had a tarsus of 66 mm (2.6 in).

California great horned owl (Bubo virginianus pacificus)

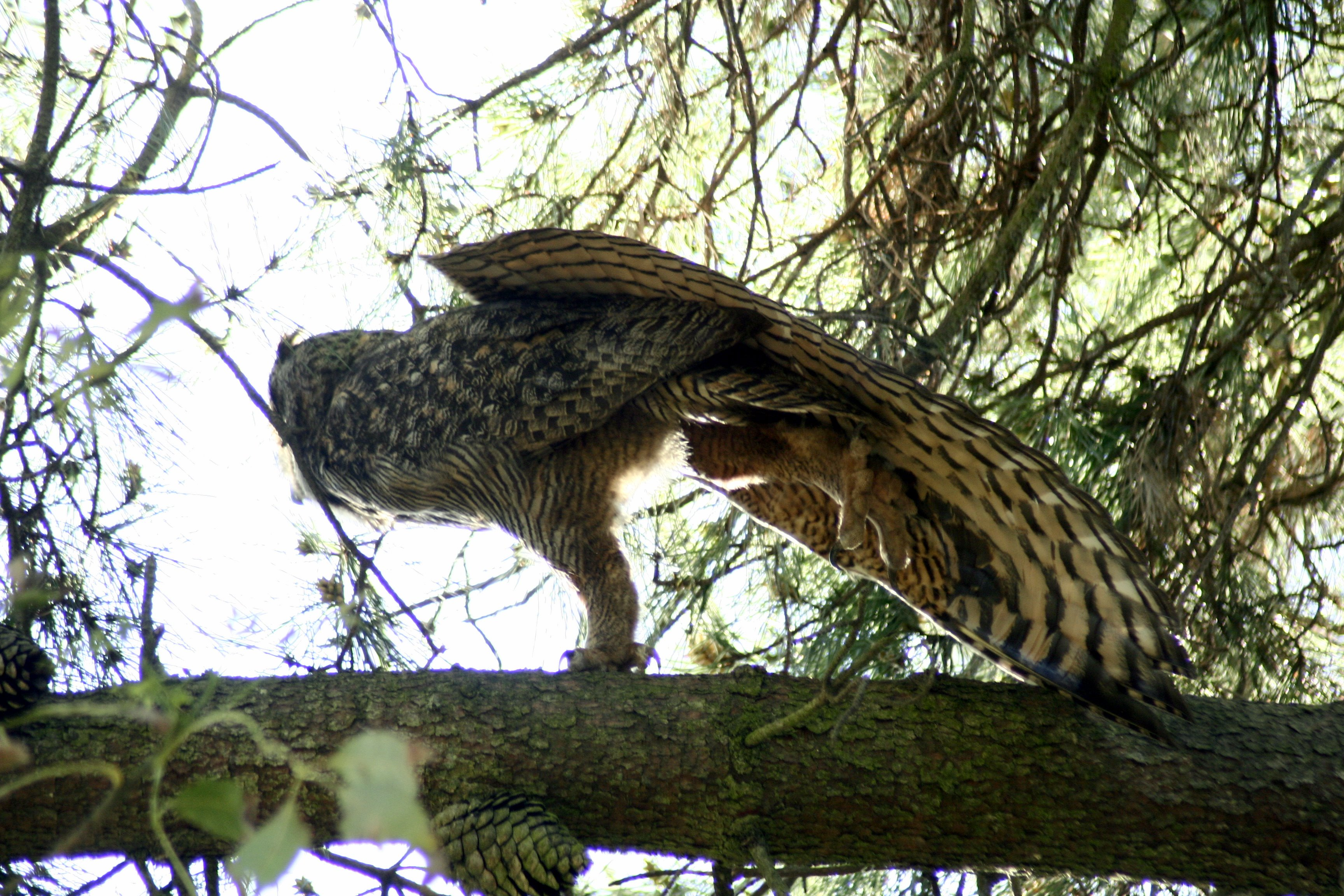
California great horned owl (B. v. pacificus) stretching, Bernal Hill Park, San Francisco

Central and southern California west of the Sierra Nevada except for the San Joaquin Valley, south to Northwestern Baja California, Mexico. Intergrades with pallescens in San Diego County, California (see also below). Resident all-year.
Very rich brown, dark underside barring distinct, less pronounced than in saturatus but more pronounced than in pallescens. Humeral area is black. Feet are mottled dark. The facial disc is often even darkly mottled. This is a fairly small-bodied race, in fact including the lightest wild great horned owl adult ever weighed. The wing chord length is 305–362 mm (12.0–14.3 in), averaging 332.5 mm (13.09 in), in males and 335–375 mm (13.2–14.8 in), averaging 351.4 mm (13.83 in), in females. Body mass ranges from 680 to 1,272 g (1.499 to 2.804 lb), averaging 991.7 g (2.186 lb), in males and from 825 to 1,668 g (1.819 to 3.677 lb), averaging 1,312.7 g (2.894 lb), in females. Tail length is 175 to 218 mm (6.9 to 8.6 in) and 203 to 230 mm (8.0 to 9.1 in) in males and females, respectively. Bill length is 34 to 41 mm (1.3 to 1.6 in) and one bird had a tarsus of 57 mm (2.2 in).

Coastal great horned owl (Bubo virginianus saturatus)

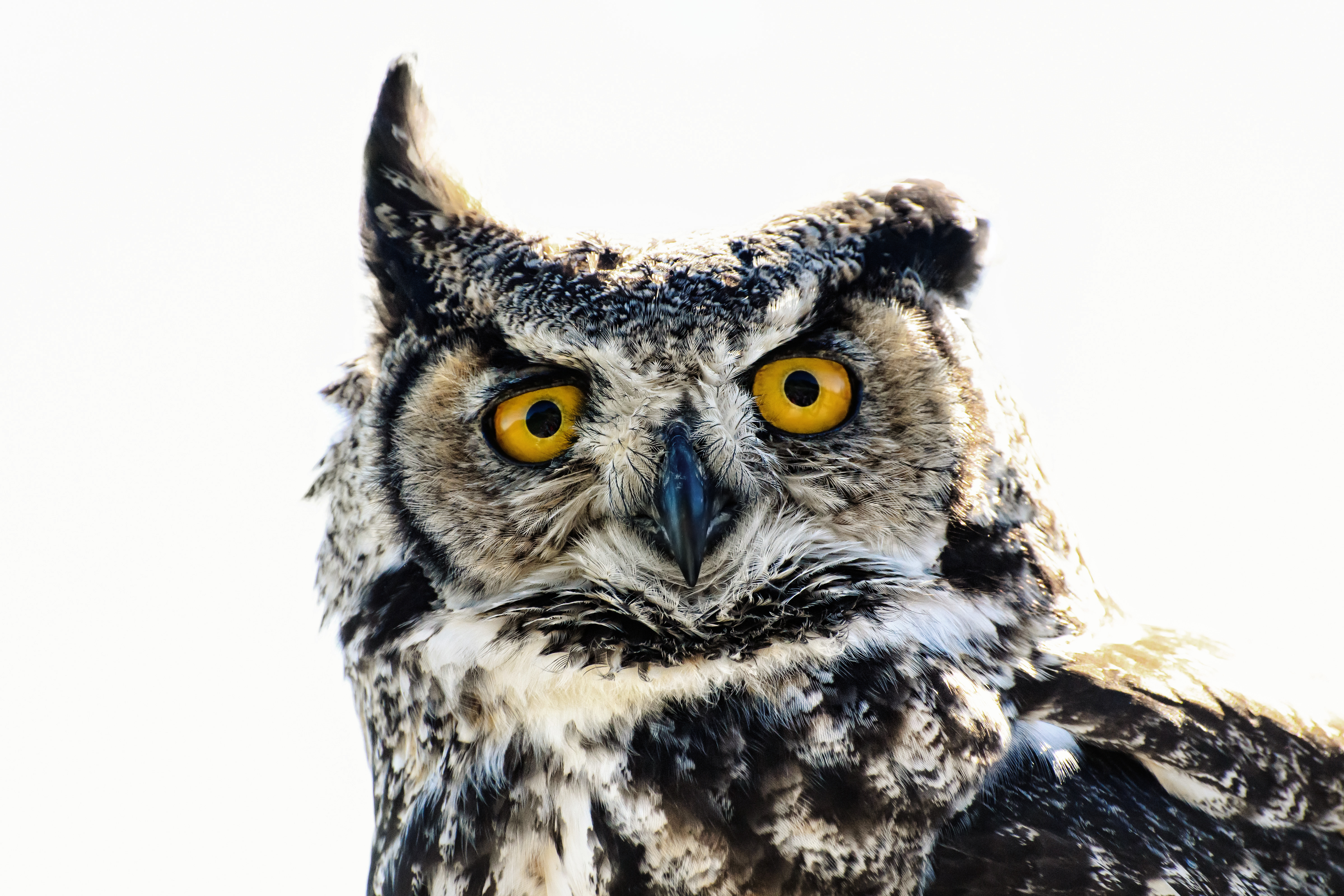
Coastal great horned owl (B. v. saturatus) at Grouse Mountain (North Vancouver, British Columbia)

Pacific coast from southeastern Alaska to northern California. Includes the previously described form of B. v. leucomelas. The often-recognized race B. v. lagophonus is often now considered a mere clinal variation of the same race from interior Alaska to Oregon, the Snake River, and northwestern Montana. These forms may be reported in winter as far south as Colorado and Texas, but these are in times of irruption.
A dark and overall brownish form with heavily barred and mottled underside, with a dull tawny base. Inland birds (lagophonus) tend to have a more grayish base, the coastal owls being more richly brown. Otherwise, inland and coastal owls are practically the same. The facial disc can range from gray to reddish-gray to dark rufous. The feet are fairly dusky gray typically, although some buff-footed individuals are known, and legs are more prominently barred with black than in other North American races. This is a large race going on linear measurements, which in Alaskan owls outmatch those of all other races but for heterocnemis in Ontario (which may itself be a discontinuous eastern wing of this race). The wing chord length is 330–370 mm (13–15 in), averaging 348.3 mm (13.71 in), in males and 339–400 mm (13.3–15.7 in), averaging 374.7 mm (14.75 in), in females. Tail length is 191 to 245 mm (7.5 to 9.6 in) and 196 to 252 mm (7.7 to 9.9 in) in males and females. In both sexes, known bill and tarsal lengths are 35 to 44 mm (1.4 to 1.7 in) and 62 to 70 mm (2.4 to 2.8 in). No weights are known to have been published.

Desert great horned owl (Bubo virginianus pallescens)

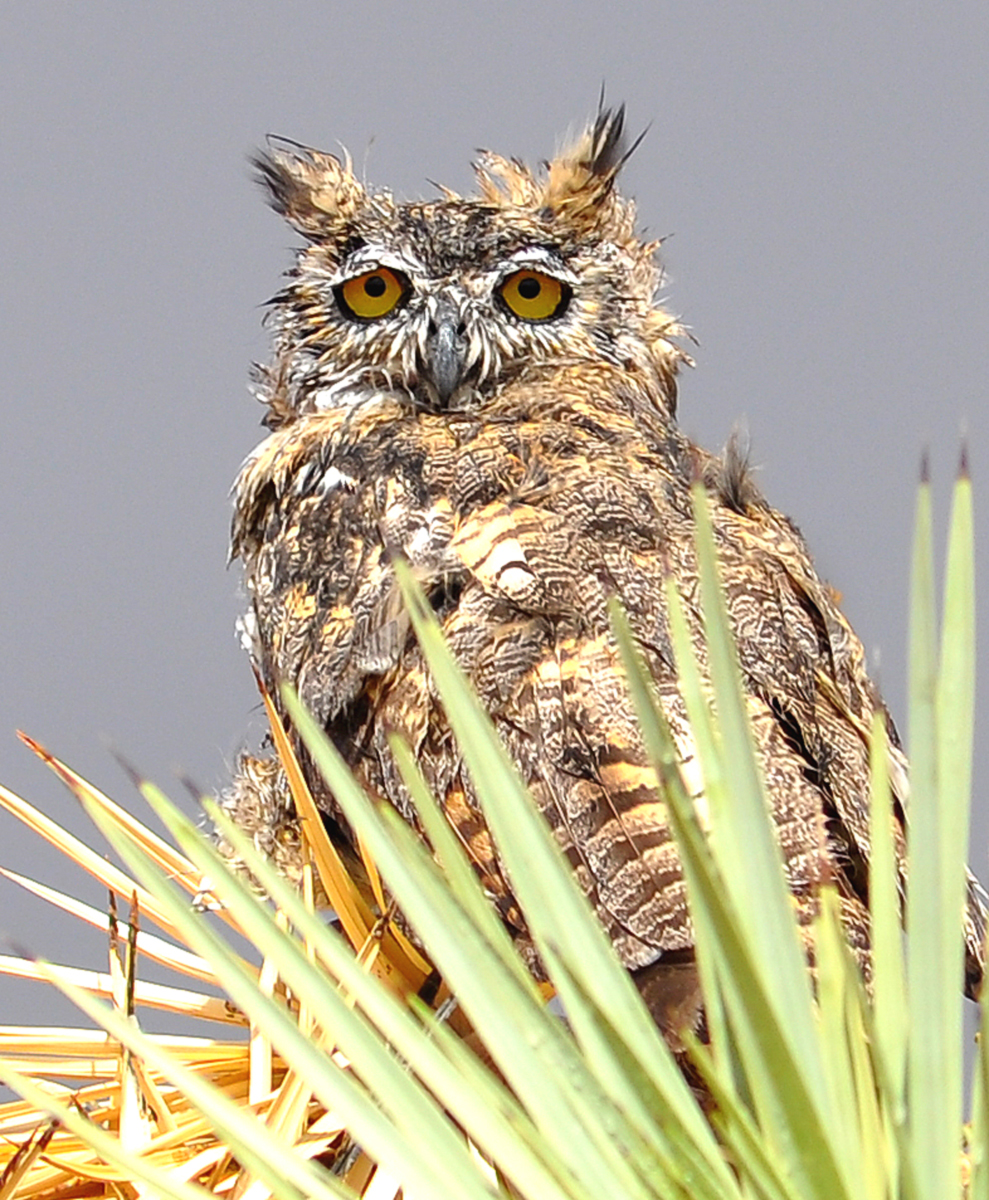
Desert great horned owl (wet feathered) (B. v. pallescens) waiting out a rainstorm in the Mojave Desert

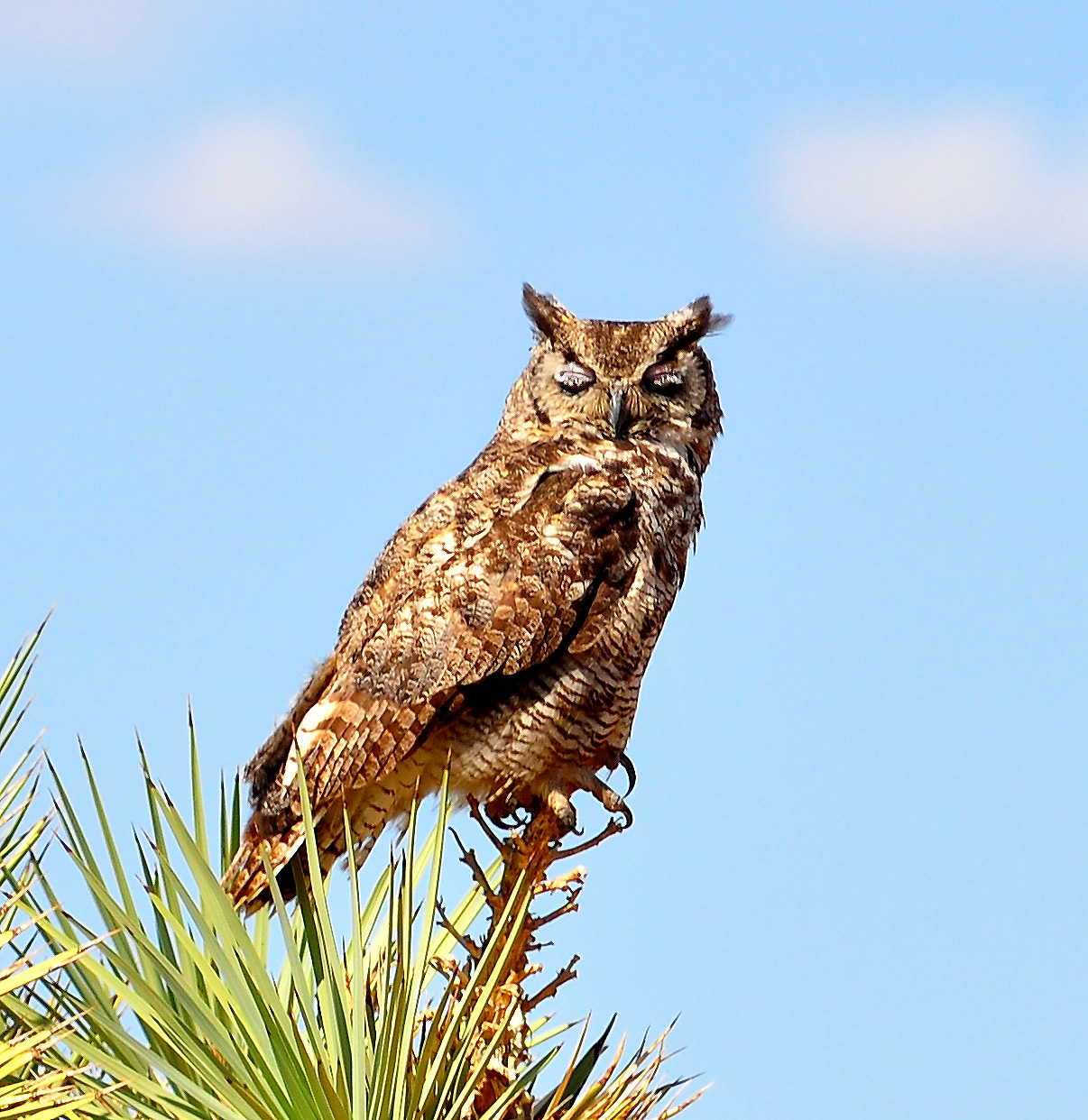
Mojave Desert, desert great horned owl (B. v. pallescens) on top of a Joshua tree in the summer of 2018

San Joaquin Valley southeastwards through arid regions of southeastern California and southern Utah eastwards to western Kansas and southwards to Guerrero and western Veracruz in Mexico; intergrades with pacificus in San Diego County, if not elsewhere; vagrant individuals of saturatus and the Rocky Mountains population, which look similar to intergrades, also seem to occur in its range. Resident all-year. This race is likely synonymous with melanocercus.
A pale dusky buff form with indistinct barring, especially on the underside. Darker individuals tend to have a deeper fulvous base to their upper sides. Humeral area is umber in color and the feathers of the feet are white and usually unmarked. A small race, it averages slightly larger in wing length than pacificus but weighs less on average. The wing chord length is 318–367 mm (12.5–14.4 in), averaging 337.2 mm (13.28 in), in males and 332–381 mm (13.1–15.0 in), averaging 348.9 mm (13.74 in), in females. Body mass ranges from 724 to 1,257 g (1.596 to 2.771 lb), averaging 914.2 g (2.015 lb), in males and from 801 to 1,550 g (1.766 to 3.417 lb), averaging 1,142.2 g (2.518 lb), in females. In both sexes, tail length is 190 to 235 mm (7.5 to 9.3 in) and bill length is 33 to 43 mm (1.3 to 1.7 in).

Yucatán great horned owl (Bubo virginianus mayensis)

Endemic to the southern two-thirds of the Yucatán Peninsula. Resident all-year.
A medium-pale form, fairly similar to pallescens in both hue and ventral markings. Going on linear measurements, B. v. mayensis is smaller than all North American horned owls, even the smallish pallescens, and is only slightly larger at median than the following race. This race has wing chord and tail lengths of 297–340 mm (11.7–13.4 in) and 180 to 198 mm (7.1 to 7.8 in) in males and 303–357 mm (11.9–14.1 in) and 199 to 210 mm (7.8 to 8.3 in) in females. In both sexes, the bill length is 39 to 41 mm (1.5 to 1.6 in) and tarsal length is 54 to 65 mm (2.1 to 2.6 in).

Baja California great horned owl (Bubo virginianus elachistus)

Southern Baja California, Mexico. Resident all-year.
Similar in color to pacificus but even darker and more heavily barred, like a miniaturized saturatus. It is considerably (5–10%) smaller than pacificus linearly; some size overlap does occur though. On average, it is the smallest known subspecies. Males have a wing chord length of 305 to 335 mm (12.0 to 13.2 in), tail length of 175 to 206 mm (6.9 to 8.1 in) and bill length of 33 to 38 mm (1.3 to 1.5 in). A single female had a wing chord of 330 mm (13 in) and tail of 211 mm (8.3 in).

Northeastern great horned owl (Bubo virginianus heterocnemis)

Breeds in eastern Canada (northern Quebec, Labrador, Newfoundland). Its southern breeding range seems to be delineated by the Saint Lawrence River. In winter, this race may disperses southwards throughout Ontario to as far as the Northeastern United States. This subspecies may be synonymous with saturatus, although it is distributed far to the east of that race. B. v. heterocnemis is surrounded by the much paler subarcticus to its west and quite differently marked virginianus to its south, the latter two overlap and possibly hybridize in some of the northeast.
A fairly dark and grey, heavily barred form. Feet pale with dusky mottling. Going on median reported linear measurements (since body mass is unknown), this is the largest bodied subspecies on average. Males have a wing chord length of 350 to 365 mm (13.8 to 14.4 in) and females range from 370 to 390 mm (15 to 15 in). In both sexes, the tail is 220 to 250 mm (8.7 to 9.8 in) and the bill is 38 to 48 mm (1.5 to 1.9 in).

Rocky Mountains great horned owl (Bubo virginianus pinorum)

The Rocky Mountains population breeds south of the Snake River in Idaho south to Arizona, New Mexico, and the Guadalupe Mountains of Texas. Westwards, it is presumed to occur to the Modoc Plateau and Mono Lake of California. This race was included in the presumed subspecies occidentalis, but was recently first described and named as a distinct subspecies and makes up the missing piece in the once-muddled distribution of great horned owls in the West and Rockies. Downslope movements into valleys occupied by pallescens might occur, but this needs study.
A medium gray form, intermediate in coloring between saturatus and pallescens. Moderately barred and tinged buff or ochraceous on the underside. Feet mottled. This is a largish race, wing chord lengths being inexplicably greater in males, at 350 to 397 mm (13.8 to 15.6 in), than in females, at 327 to 367 mm (12.9 to 14.4 in). Tail length can range from 190 to 233 mm (7.5 to 9.2 in) and a female weighed 1,246 g (2.747 lb).

=== Species identification ===
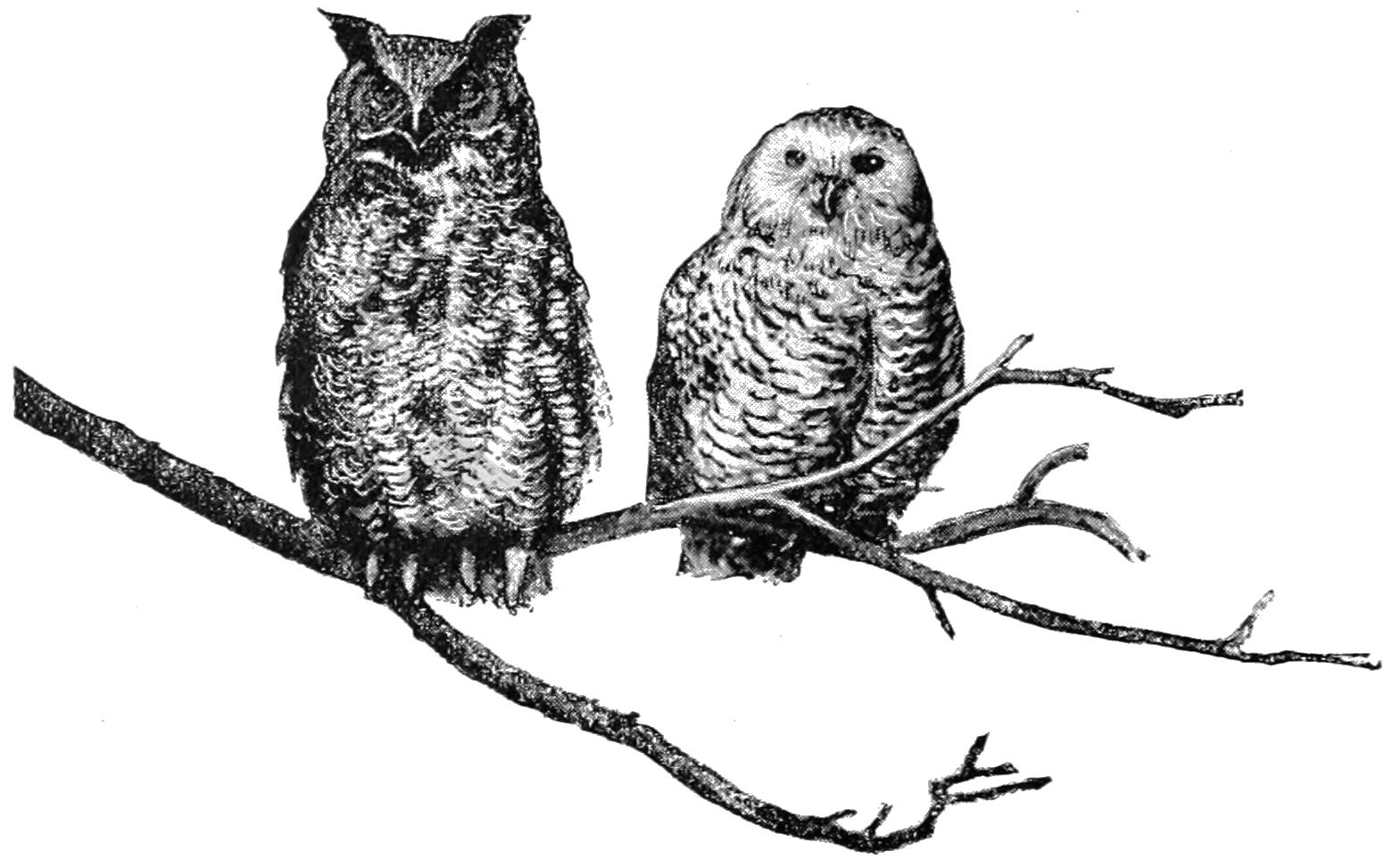
Illustrated comparison of a great horned owl, left, to its closest North American relative, the snowy owl

The combination of the species' bulk, prominent ear tufts and barred plumage distinguishes it through much of the range, but it may be easily confused with the Magellanic horned owl (B. magellanicus), which may overlap in range. The Magellanic horned owl was once considered a subspecies of the great horned, but is now almost universally considered a distinct species, as is supported by genetic materials, with the great horned being the paraspecies. Overall coloration is similar, but the Magellanic is markedly smaller with smaller feet and a smaller head, with finer, but more numerous brownish bars on the underside, rather than the blotchy, irregular barring typical of great horned owls. Other eagle-owls may superficially be somewhat similar, but the species is generically allopatric with the exception of wintering snowy owls. More tropical species with ear tufts, the stygian owl (A. stygius) and striped owl (A. clamator), are much smaller. Other large owls lack ear tufts.

== Distribution and habitat ==
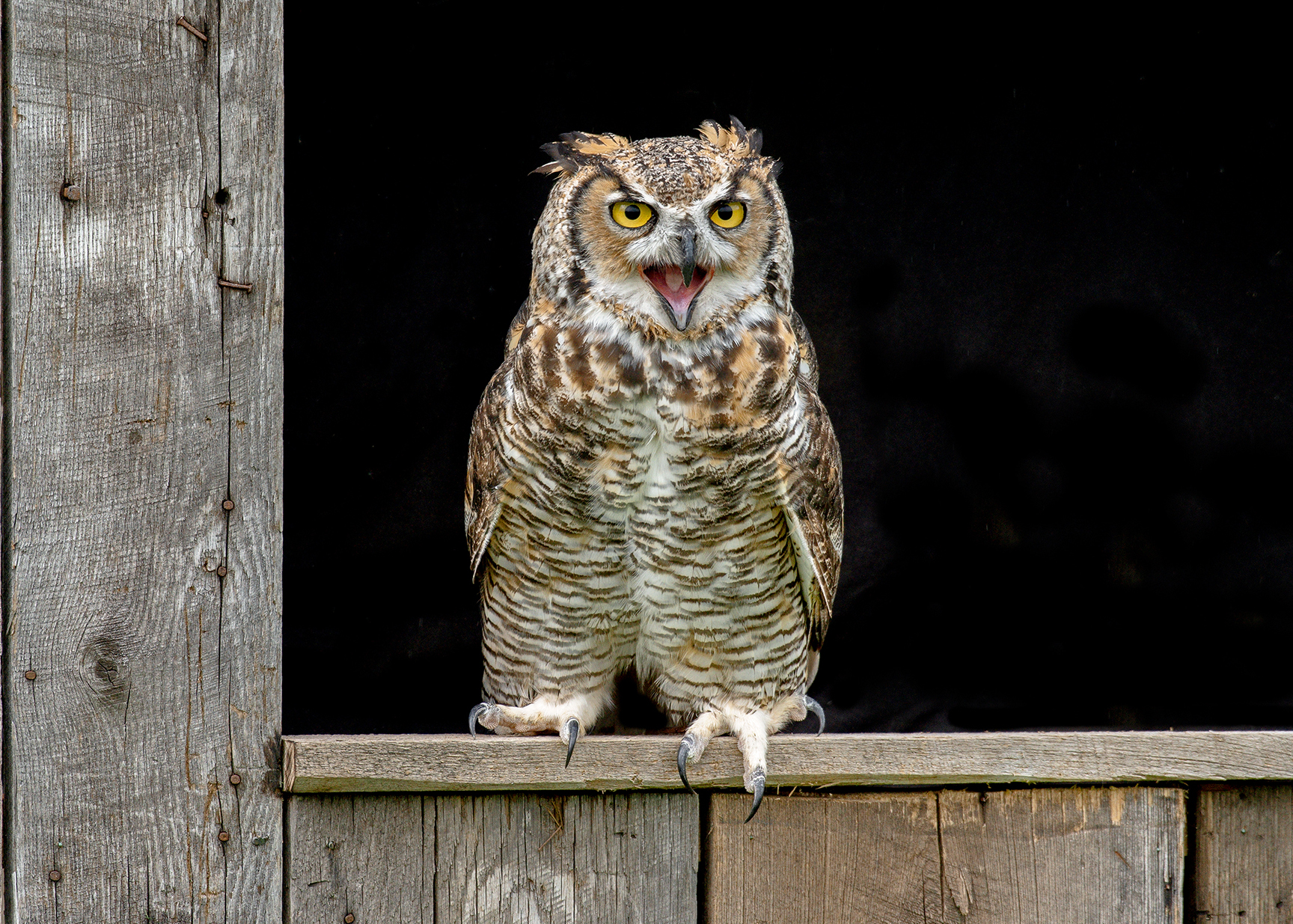
A great horned owl in a barn, Ontario, Canada

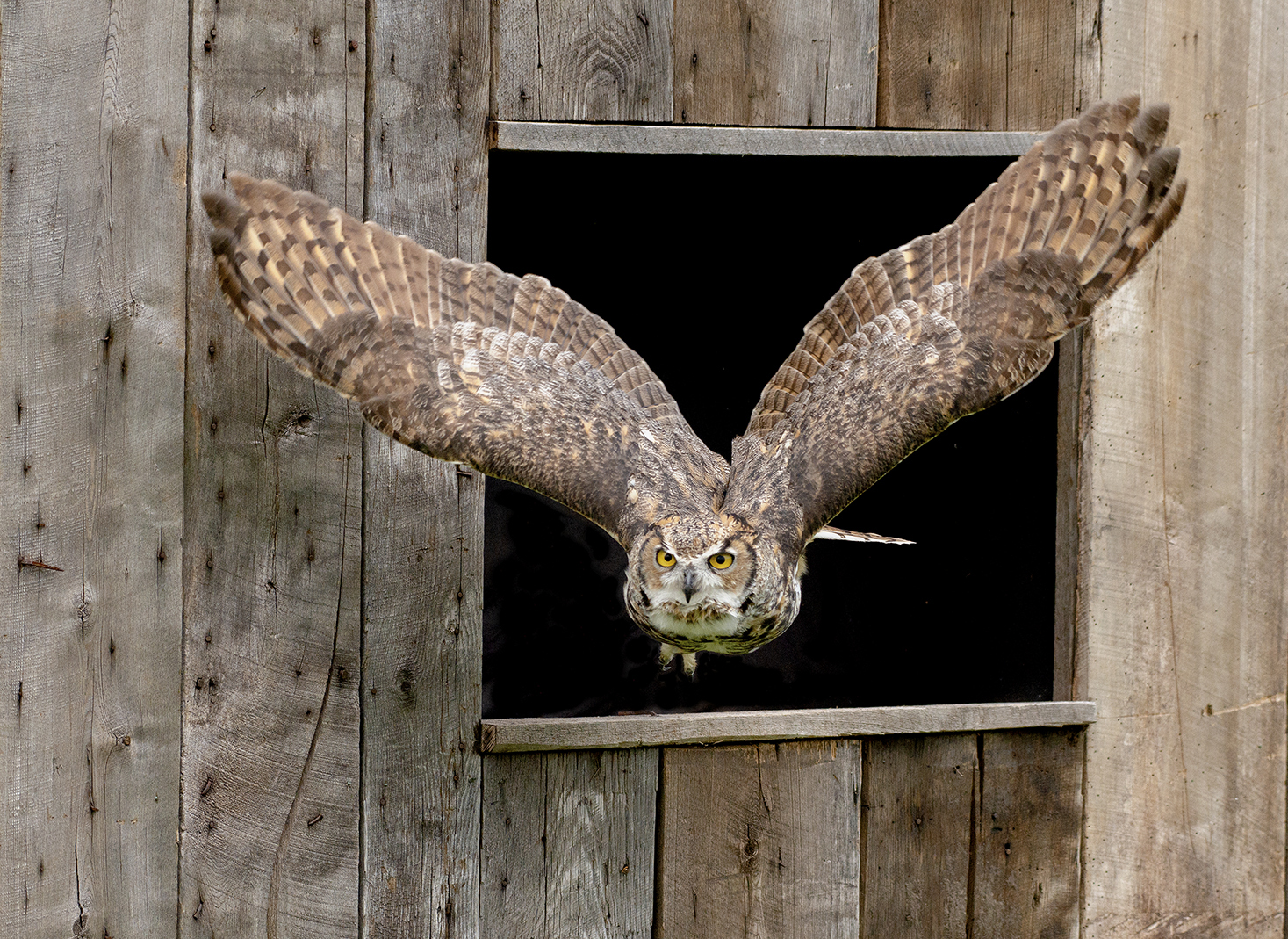
The same owl in flight

The breeding habitat of the great horned owl extends high into the subarctic of North America, where they are found up to the northwestern and southern Mackenzie Mountains, Keewatin, Ontario, northern Manitoba, Fort Chimo in Ungava, Okak, Newfoundland and Labrador, Anticosti Island and Prince Edward Island. They are distributed throughout most of North America and very spottily in Central America. It is absent or rare from southern Guatemala, El Salvador, Nicaragua, and Costa Rica to Panama (where only two records) in Central America. The species is also absent from the West Indies, Haida Gwaii, and almost all off-shore islands in the Americas, its ability to colonize islands apparently being considerably less than those of barn owls and short-eared owls. Since the division into two species, the great horned owl is the second most widely distributed owl in the Americas, just after the barn owl.

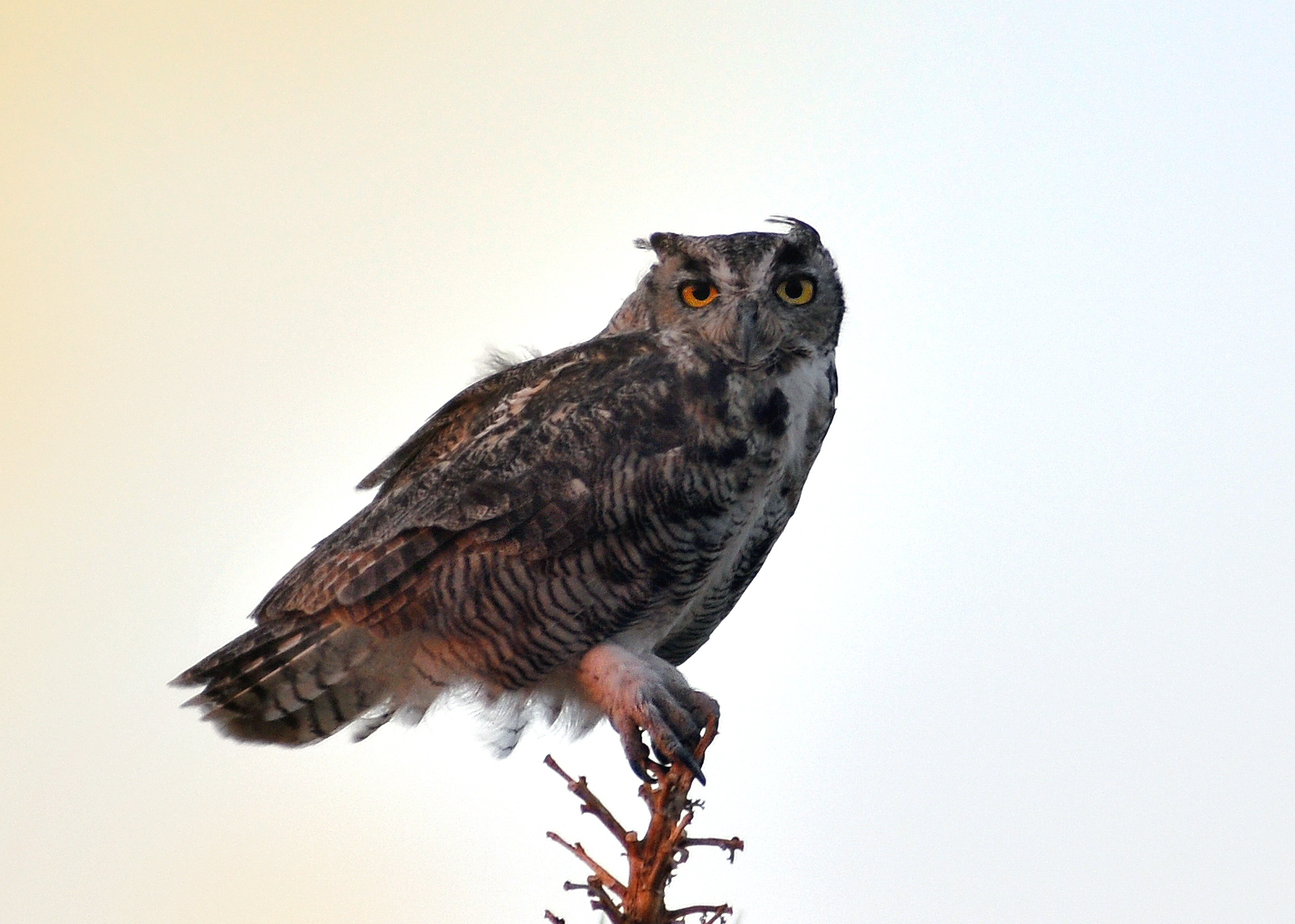
Desert great horned owl (B. v. pallescens) perched on the top of a Joshua tree in Landers, California

The great horned owl is among the world's most adaptable owls or even bird species in terms of habitat. The great horned owl can take up residence in trees that border all manner of deciduous, coniferous, and mixed forests, tropical rainforests, pampas, prairie, mountainous areas, deserts, subarctic tundra, rocky coasts, mangrove swamp forests, and some urban areas. It is less common in the more extreme areas of the Americas. In the Mojave and Sonora Deserts, they are absent from the heart of the deserts and are only found on the vegetated or rocky fringes. Even in North America, they are rare in landscapes including more than 70% old-growth forest, such as the aspen forest of the Rockies. In the Appalachian Mountains, they appear to use old-growth forest but in Arkansas are often found near temporary agricultural openings in the midst of large areas of woodland. Similarly in south-central Pennsylvania, the owls use cropland and pasture more than deciduous and total forest cover, indicating preference for fragmented landscapes. In prairies, grasslands and deserts, they can successfully live year-round as long as there are rocky canyons, steep gullies and/or wooded coulees with shade-giving trees to provide shelter and nesting sites.

In mountainous areas of North America, they are usually absent above the tree line, but great horned owls can be found up to 2,100 m (6,900 ft) in California and 3,300 m (10,800 ft) in the Rockies. They are generally rare in non-tidal wetland habitat and are replaced in the high Arctic tundra by snowy owls. They prefer areas where open habitats, which they often hunt in, and woods, where they tend to roost and nest, are juxtaposed. Thus lightly populated rural regions can be ideal. This species can occasionally be found in urban or suburban areas. However, they seem to prefer areas with less human activity and are most likely to be found in park-like settings in such developed areas, unlike eastern and western screech owls (Megascops asio & M. kennicottii) which may regularly occur in busy suburban settings. All mated great horned owls are permanent residents of their territories, but unmated and younger birds move freely in search of company and a territory and leave regions with little food in winter.

== Behavior ==
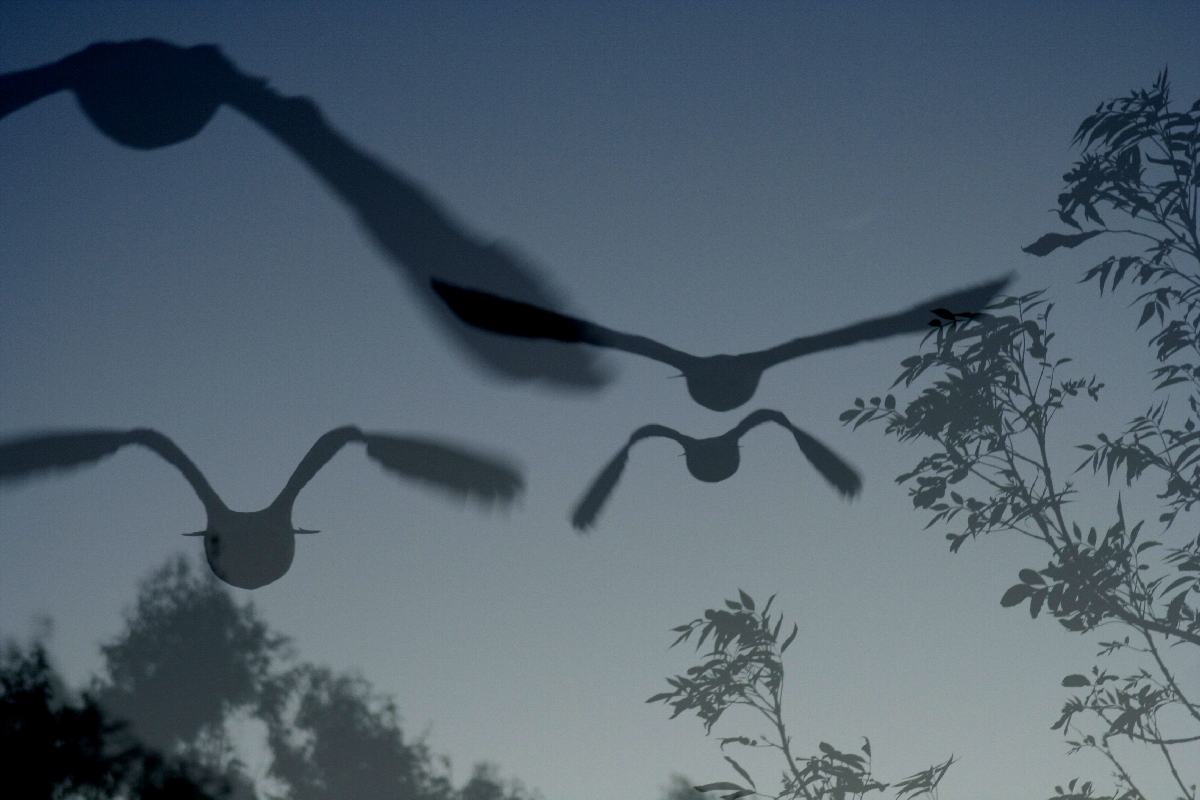
Composite photo of great horned owl flight phases

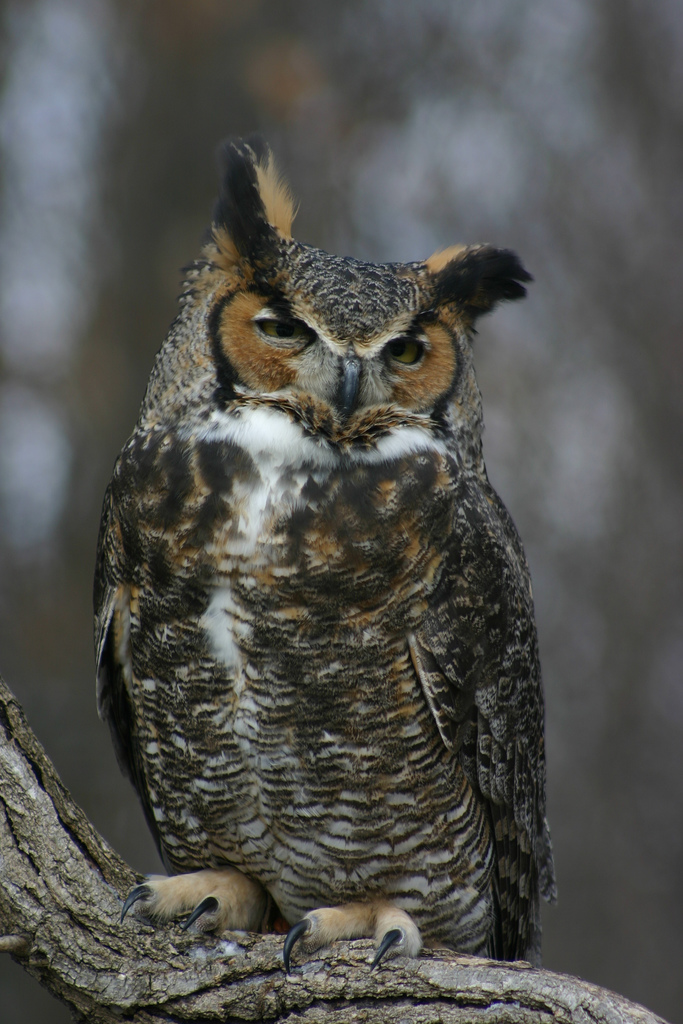
Great horned owls are typically sluggish and passive but aware during daytime.

In most aspects of their behavior, great horned owls are typical of owls and most birds of prey. Like most owls, the great horned owl makes great use of secrecy and stealth. Due to its natural-colored plumage, it is well camouflaged both while active at night and while roosting during the day. During the daytime it roosts usually in large trees (including snags and large hollows but usually thick branches) but may occasionally be in crevices or small caves in rocks or in dense shrubbery. Pine and other coniferous trees may be preferred where available since they are particularly dense and provide cover throughout the year. Typically, males have a favorite roosting site not far from the nest, sometimes used over successive years. While roosting, great horned owls may rest in the "tall-thin" position, where they sit as erect and hold themselves as slim as is possible. The kind of posture is well known as a further method of camouflage for other owls, like long-eared owls or great grey owls, especially if humans or other potential mammalian carnivores approach them.

Outside of the nesting season, great horned owls may roost wherever their foraging path ends at dawn. Generally great horned owls are active at night, although in some areas they may be active in the late afternoon or early morning. At dusk, the owl utters a few calls before flying to a more open sing-post, i.e. large bare branch or large rocks to deliver song. Normally several perches are used to mark occupied territory or to attract a female. Despite its camouflage and cryptic locations, this species can still sometimes be spotted on its daytime roosts, especially by American crows (Corvus brachyrhynchos). Since owls are, next to red-tailed hawks, perhaps the main predator of crows and their young, crows sometimes congregate from considerable distances to mob owls and caw angrily at them for hours on end. When the owls try to fly off to avoid this harassment, they are often followed by the corvids.

=== Territoriality and movements ===
Typically, great horned owls are highly sedentary, often capable of utilizing a single territory throughout their mature lives. Although some species such as snowy owls, northern saw-whet owls, long-eared and short-eared owls are true migrants, most North American owls are not migratory and will generally show fidelity to a single territory year around. In great horned owls, mated pairs occupy territories year-round and long-term. Territories are established and maintained through hooting, with highest activity before egg-laying and second peak in autumn when juveniles disperse, and can range from an average of 16 km^{2} (6.2 sq mi) in Yukon to an average of 2.1 km^{2} (0.81 sq mi) in Wyoming.

Most territorial defense is performed by males, but females frequently assist their partners in hooting contests with neighbors or intruders, even during incubation. On occasion, although territory borders may be successfully maintained via vocalizations alone without even seeing the competing owl, such confrontations may turn physical, with various levels of threats distinguished. The highest threat level involves the spreading of wings, bill-clapping, hissing, higher-pitched screams of longer duration, with general body poised to strike with its feet at intruder. If the intruder continues to press the confrontation, the defending owl will "hop" forward and strike it with feet, attempting to grasp and rake with claws.

Territoriality appears to place a limit on the number of breeding pairs in a given area. Individuals prevented from establishing a territory live a silent existence as "floaters". Radio-telemetry revealed that such floaters concentrate along boundaries of established territories. At Kluane Lake in Yukon, incursions into neighboring territories were observed only twice—by females when a neighboring female had died or emigrated, suggesting that territorial defense may be sex-specific. At least four dead great horned owls in Kluane were apparently killed by others of their own species in territorial conflicts. Owls killed by other horned owls are sometimes cannibalized, although the origin of the killing may have been territorial aggression. Northern populations occasionally irrupt south during times of food shortage, but there is no annual migration even at the northern limits of the great horned owl's range.

=== Hunting behavior ===
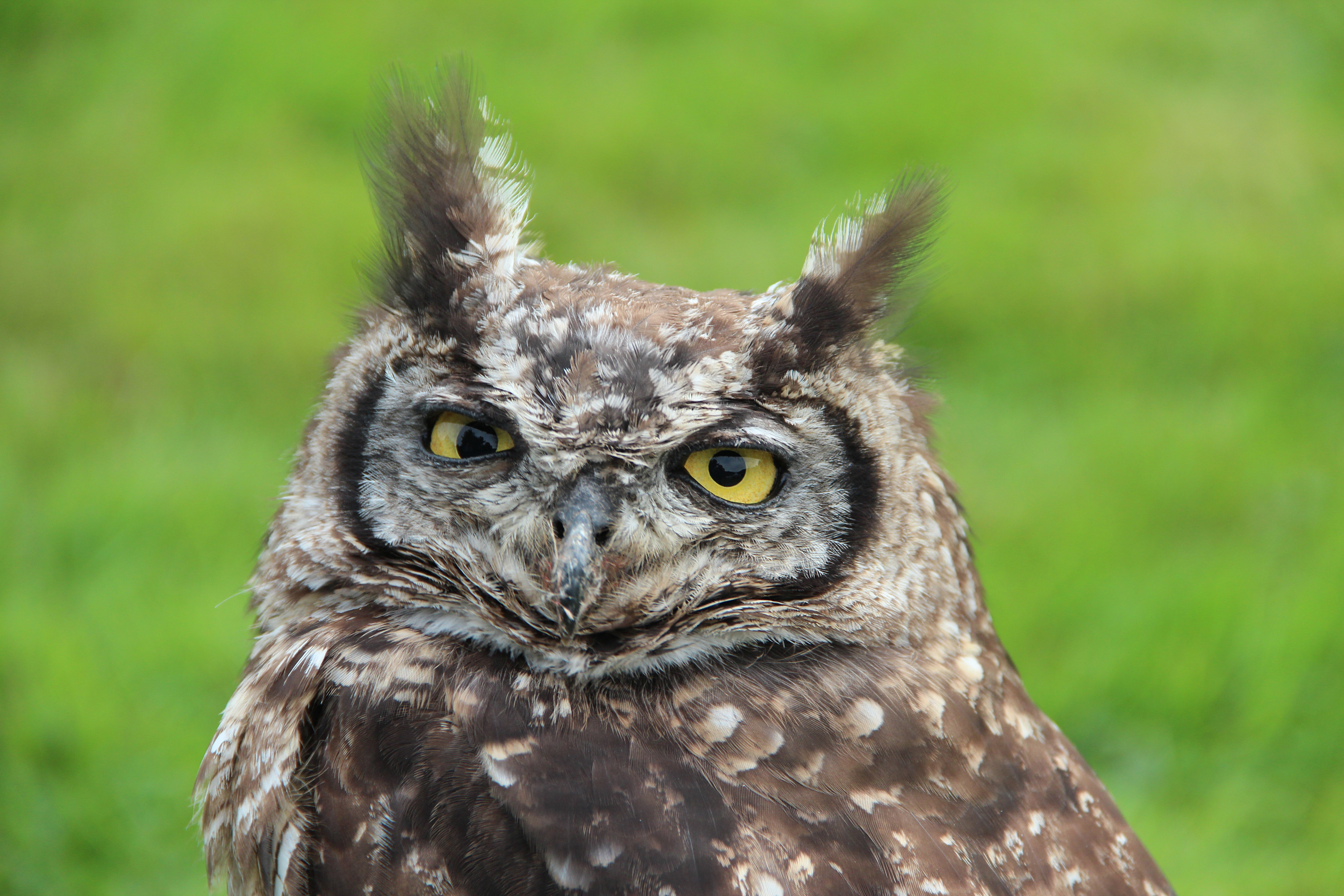
Its piercing yellow eyes and ear tufts

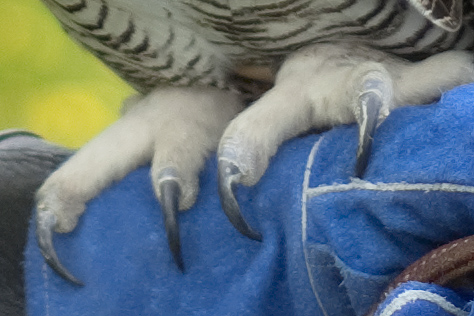
Closeup of great horned owl toes and talons

Hunting tends to peak between 8:30 pm and midnight and then can resume from 4:30 am to sunrise. Hunting tends to be most prolonged during winter by virtue of prey being more scarce. However, great horned owls can learn to target certain prey during daylight in the afternoon when it is more vulnerable, such as eastern fox squirrels (Sciurus niger) while they are building their leaf nests and chuckawallas (Sauromalus ater) sunning themselves on desert rocks. Owls hunt mainly by watching from a snag, pole or other high perch. During hunting forays, they often fly about 50 to 100 m (160 to 330 ft) from perch to perch, stopping to survey for food at each, until they sense a prey item below. From such vantage points, owls dive down to the ground, often with wings folded, to ambush their prey. Effective maximum hunting distance of an owl from an elevated perch is 90 m (300 ft). Due to their short but broad wings, great horned owls are ideally suited for low speed and maneuverability.

Despite reports that they do not hunt on the wing, they also sometimes hunt by flying low over openings on the ground, scanning below for prey activity. Great horned owls can fly at speeds of more than 65 km/h (40 mph) in level flight. Hunting flights are slow, often quartering low above the ground where prey is likely to occur in open country or open woodland. Brief hovering flight (for about 6–18 seconds) has been described, especially in windy areas. On occasion owls may actually walk on the ground in pursuit of small prey or, rarely, inside a chicken coop to prey on the fowl within. Rodents and invertebrates may be caught on foot around the base of bushes, through grassy areas, and near culverts and other human structures in range and farm habitat. The great horned owl is generally a poor walker on the ground; it walks like a starling, with a pronounced side-to-side gait. They have been known to wade into shallow water for aquatic prey, although this has been only rarely reported. Owls can snatch birds and some arboreal mammals directly from tree branches in a glide as well. The stiff feathering of their wings allows owls to produce minimal sound in flight while hunting.

Almost all prey are killed by crushing with the owl's feet or by incidentally stabbing of the talons, though some may be bitten about the face as well. Prey is swallowed whole when possible. When prey is swallowed whole, owls regurgitate pellets of bone and other non-digestible bits about 6 to 10 hours later, usually in the same location where the prey was consumed. Great horned owl pellets are dark gray or brown in color and very large, 7.6 to 10.2 cm (3.0 to 4.0 in) long and 3.8 cm (1.5 in) thick, and have been known to contain skulls up to 3 cm (1.2 in) in width inside them. However, not all prey can be swallowed at once, and owls will also fly with prey to a perch and tear off pieces with their bill. Most dietary studies focus on pellets found under perches and around nests, since they provide a more complete picture of the diversity of prey consumed, but prey remains outside of pellets may provide clues to prey excluded from the pellets and a combination of both is recommended.

Many large prey items are dismembered. Great horned owls may behead large prey before taking it to its nest or eating perch. The legs may also be removed, as may (in some bird prey) the wings. The great horned owl will also crush the bones of its prey to make it more compact for carrying. On occasion, the owls may return to the kill site to continue eating if the prey is too heavy to fly with after dismemberment. Many owls will accrue a cache of prey, especially those who are nesting. Caches must be at a safe location, usually the crotch of a tall tree. In northern regions, where large prey is prevalent, an owl may let uneaten food freeze and then thaw it out later using its own body heat. Hunting success seems to require fairly open understory, and experimental testing of microhabitat proved that open areas provided more hunting success on five species of rodent, with cloudy nights and denser bush foliage both decreasing success.

== Prey and trophic ecology ==
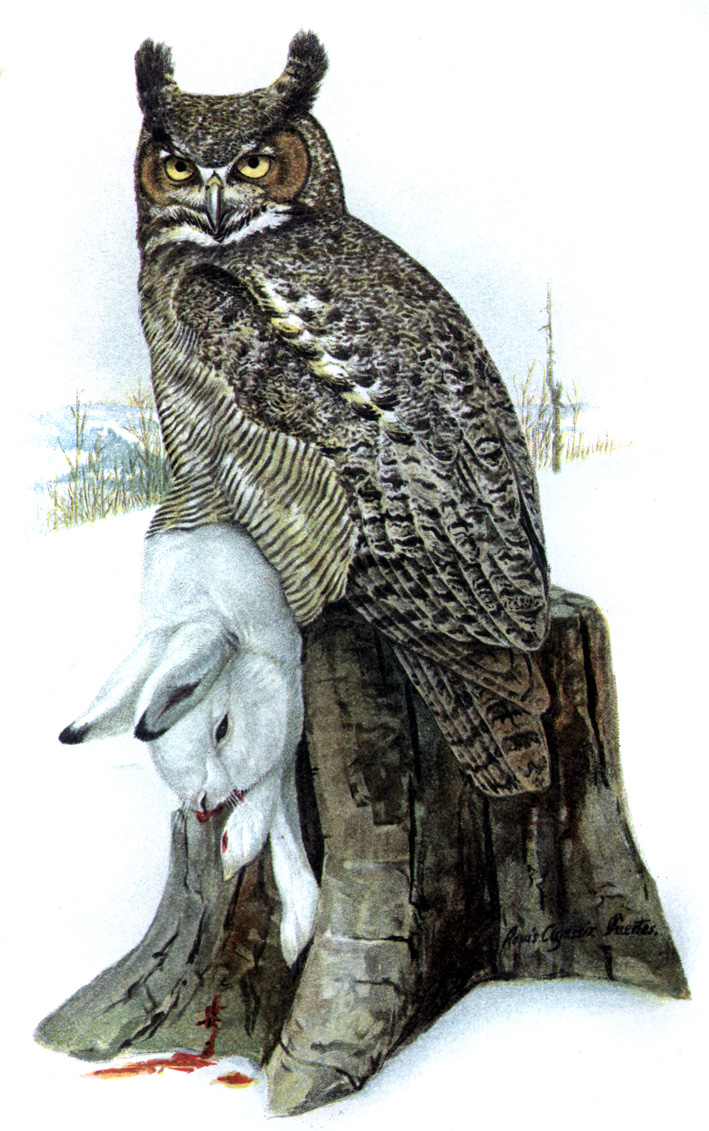
Painting by Louis Agassiz Fuertes depicting a great horned owl with one of its primary prey species, a snowshoe hare

Prey can vary greatly based on opportunity. According to one author, "Almost any living creature that walks, crawls, flies, or swims, except the large mammals, is the great horned owl's legitimate prey". In fact, the great horned owl has the most diverse prey profile of any raptor in the Americas. Over 500 species have been identified as great horned owl prey, with dozens more identified only to genus or general type (especially numerous invertebrates) and presumably several more unknown from their relatively little-studied populations in the Neotropics. Mammals (more than 200 species) and birds (nearly 300 species) make up the majority of their diet. Their diet in North America is made up of 87.6% mammals, 6.1% birds, 1.6% reptiles and amphibians with the remaining 4.7% being made up by insects, other assorted invertebrates and fish.

Estimated mass of individual prey for the owls has ranged from as little as 0.4 g (0.014 oz) to as much as 6.8 kg (15 lb) Most prey is in the range of 4 g (0.14 oz) (shrews) to 2,300 g (5.1 lb) (jackrabbits). A single owl requires about 50 to 100 g (1.8 to 3.5 oz) of food per day and can subsist on a large kill over several days. Despite the great diversity of prey taken by these predators, in most of the continental United States from the East to the Midwest as well as Canada and Alaska, great horned owls largely live off just a handful of prey species: three species of lagomorph: the eastern cottontail (Sylvilagus floridanus), the snowshoe hare (Lepus americanus) and the black-tailed jackrabbit (Lepus californicus); two species of New World mice: the white-footed mouse and the North American deermouse (Peromyscus leucopus & maniculatus); approximately three species of vole: the meadow, prairie and woodland voles (Microtus pennsylvanicus, ochrogaster & pinetorum); and one introduced pest, the brown rat.

=== Rodents ===
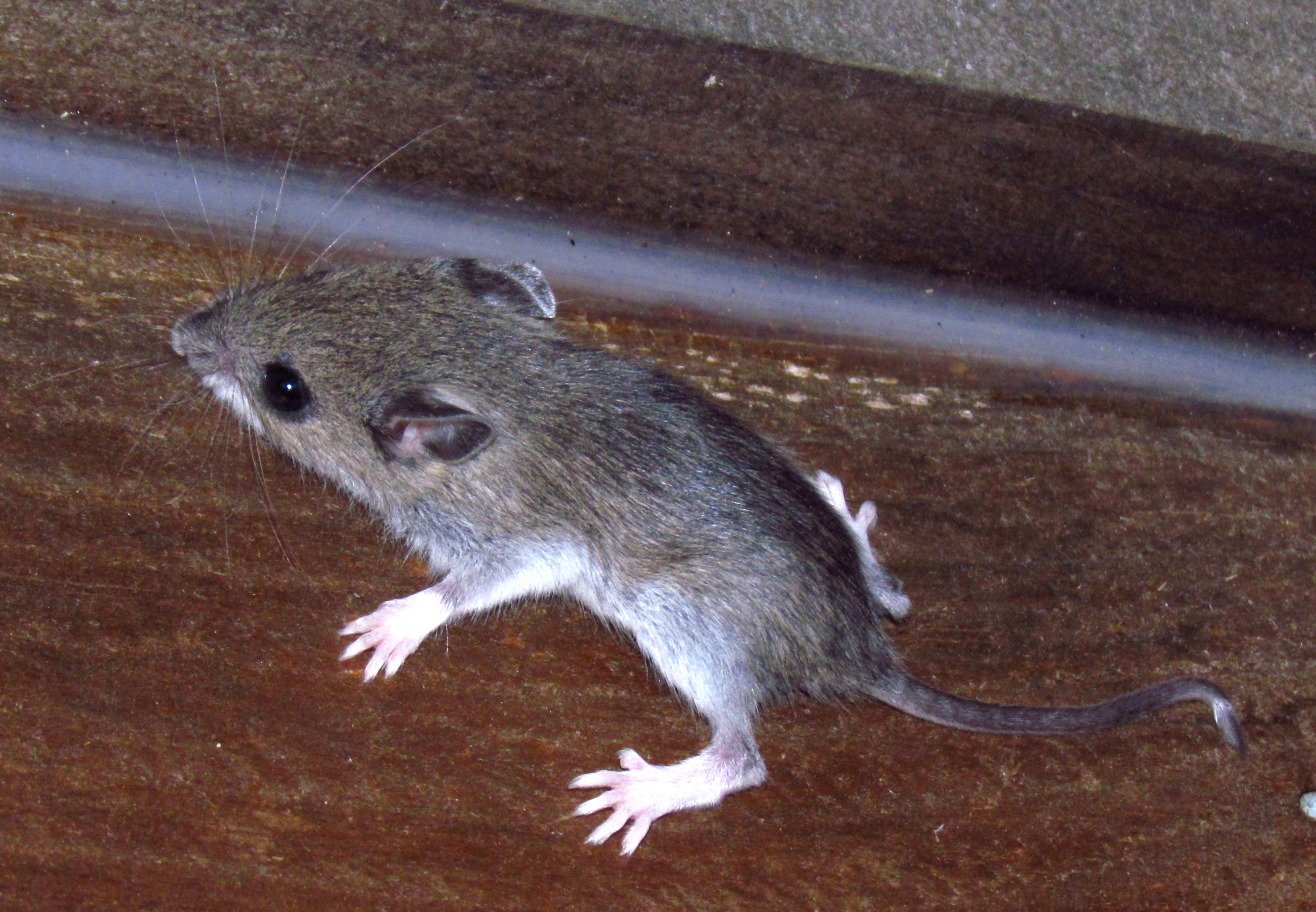
A large portion of the great horned owl's food consists of small rodents, such as white-footed mice.

Small rodents form the great majority of great horned owl prey by number. Weighing a mere 14 to 31.5 g (0.49 to 1.11 oz) and 20 to 58 g (0.71 to 2.05 oz) on average, the nine species of New World mice in Peromyscus and eight species of voles in Microtus recorded in the diet would appear to be overly small to be as important as they are to a predatory bird of this size. The prominence of these genera is undoubtedly due to the abundance of both genera in the wooded edge habitats frequented by great horned owls. It is estimated that a family of owls with two offspring would need to take about a half dozen (voles) to a dozen (mice) of these rodents every night to satisfy their dietary requirements but apparently the accessibility and abundance of these foods is irresistible as their numeric dominance is indisputable. By winter in areas that hold heavy snow, Peromyscus mice often come to outnumber the voles in the diet since the mice tend to travel over the surface of the snow while the voles make tunnels underneath the snow. In fact, a healthy family of great horned owls can decimate a colony of field rats, thus potentially performing a key role in controlling a highly destructive pest. Great horned owls living in the timbered fringes of garbage or refuse dumps may subsist mostly on rats.

In the Rockies, California, the Southwestern United States and northern Mexico, the diversity of this species' diet rises, in sync with the diversity of rodents. Especially important, from Colorado to Washington state is the northern pocket gopher (Thomomys talpoides), although assorted other pocket gophers (Geomys, Cratogeomys, Zygogeomys, Pappogeomys and other Thomomys ssp.) are readily taken. While the northern weighs from 90 to 120 g (3.2 to 4.2 oz), other pocket gophers hunted average from 95 to 545 g (0.209 to 1.202 lb) in mass. From Washington to Baja California a very important food is the pocket mice, primarily the Great Basin pocket mouse (Perognathus parvus). While the Great Basin species is a relative giant at 22 g (0.78 oz), other hunted pocket mice (which may include both Perognathus and Chaetodipus ssp.) can average nearly as light as 8 g (0.28 oz). In East Texas, the 159 g (5.6 oz) hispid cotton rat (Sigmodon hispidus) is the most commonly recorded prey species. The same species constituted 75% by number of a small sampling in Oklahoma. In semi-desert and other arid habitats, kangaroo rats become increasingly important prey, ten species have been reported in the diet but most prominently the Ord's and Merriam's kangaroo rats (Dipodomys ordii & merriami), both being widespread, numerous and relatively diminutive (at 42 and 48 g (1.5 and 1.7 oz)). Eight known larger species of kangaroo rats, including the giant kangaroo rat (Dipodomys ingens) averaging at 152 g (5.4 oz), are also taken.

The squirrels, including ground squirrels, marmots (Marmota), prairie dogs (Cynomys), chipmunks and tree squirrels, are diurnal and so are largely unavailable to great horned owls as prey. Occasionally though, one will be caught from their leaf nest, nest hole or burrow entrance first thing in the morning or in the late afternoon and approximately 35 species have been successfully predated by these owls. In general larger sized than other rodent families, the species hunting range from the 62 g (2.2 oz) gray-collared chipmunk (Tamias cinereicollis) to the 5,775 g (12.732 lb) hoary marmot (Marmota caligata); thus, squirrels can provide a very fulfilling meal. An even larger rodent is sometimes attacked as prey by great horned owls, the North American porcupine (Erethizon dorsatum), in which average adults range from 4,500 to 9,000 g (9.9 to 19.8 lb). This has been determined from owls who have porcupine quills imbedded in them, sometimes resulting in death. On occasion, they are successful in killing porcupine, even adults as determined by the size of the quills left behind and prey remains at bloodied kill sites. Other rodents recorded as secondary prey in North America include flying squirrels (Glaucomys ssp.), the golden mouse (Ochrotomys nuttalli), red-backed voles & bog lemmings (Myodes & Synaptomys ssp.), the muskrat (Ondatra zibethicus), the northern grasshopper mouse (Onychomys leucogaster), the northern pygmy mouse (Baiomys taylori) and jumping mice (Zapus & Napaeozapus ssp.).

=== Lagomorphs ===
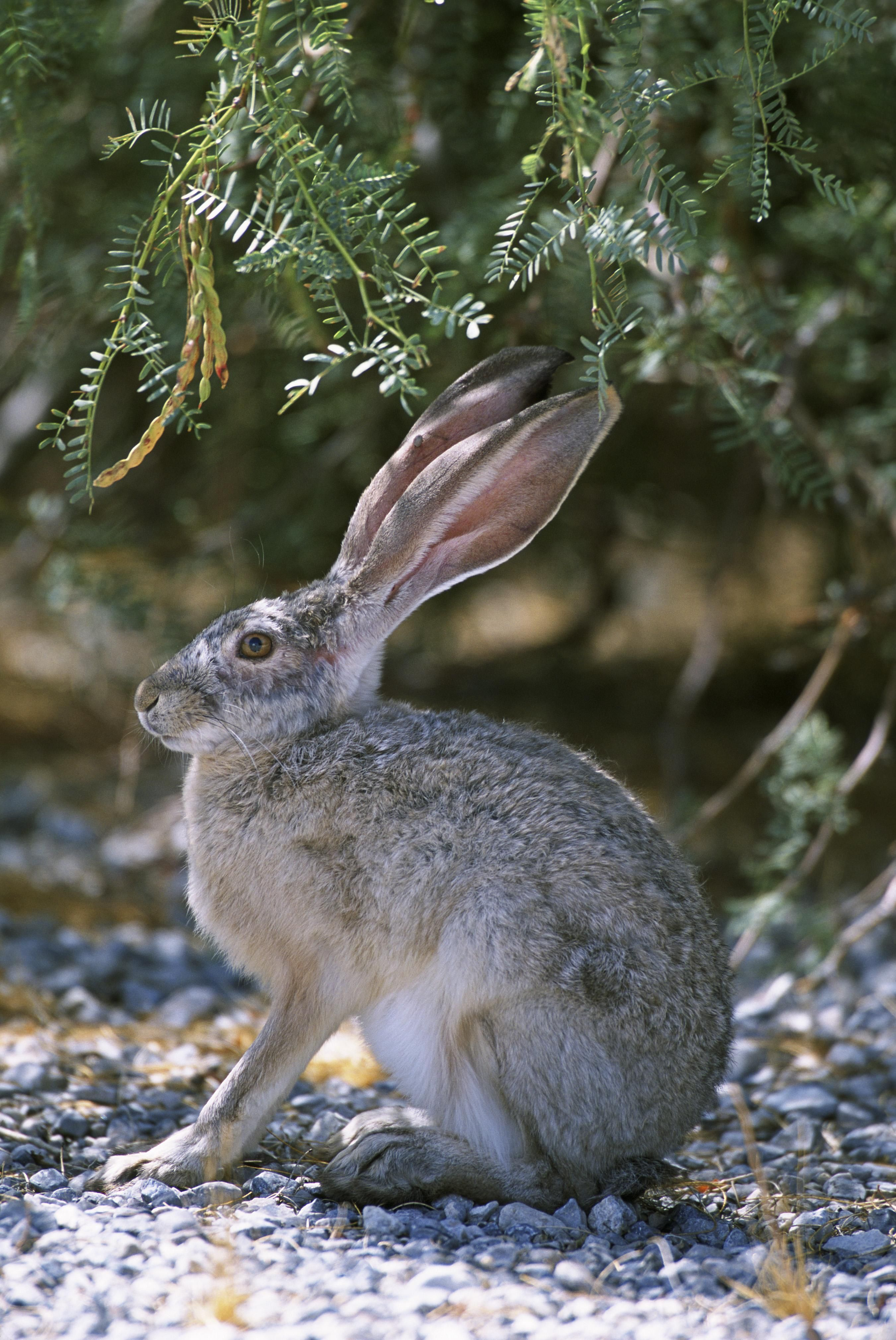
Black-tailed jackrabbits are an important food source for western great horned owls.

Although generally no match for rodents in the sheer quantity of individuals, in terms of prey biomass, the most significant prey of North American great horned owls are hares and rabbits. About a dozen lagomorphs species are known to be hunted by the owl, from the relatively tiny 420 g (0.93 lb) pygmy rabbit to adult jackrabbits weighing more than 2,000 g (4.4 lb). These species are overall the largest regular prey for this species.

In Utah, where great horned owls are dependent on the jackrabbits, average brood size rose from 2 at jackrabbit population lows to 3.3 when the jackrabbits were at their peak. At the peak of the population cycle, jackrabbits accounted for 90.2% and desert cottontails (Sylvilagus audubonii) for another 8.7% of prey biomass. In the short-grass prairie of Colorado, mountain cottontail (Sylvilagus nuttallii) and black-tailed jackrabbits predominated in October to December, making up 42.9% by number (and nearly all the biomass), thence dropping to 9.3% by number in April, while voles rose to 32.2% peak in May, down to a minimum of 10.2% by number in June. Further north in Colorado, in the absence of jackrabbits, the mountain cottontails falls to third place by number (12.9%) behind the northern pocket gopher (36.5%) and prairie vole (24.7%) but still dominates the biomass, making up about half.

In central Utah, the lagomorphs (black-tailed jackrabbit/desert cottontail) and Ord's kangaroo rat each made up 39% of the food by number, respectively. The mountain cottontail dominates the biomass of prey in the Sierran foothills of California, making up 61.1% of the biomass, although are numerically secondary to desert woodrat. Remarkably, in the Morley Nelson Snake River Birds of Prey National Conservation Area of Idaho, individual rodents (1159 counted) were more than 10 times more numerous than lagomorphs (114 counted) by quantity and yet the jackrabbit and mountain cottontail still made up approximately half of the biomass. The dependence on lagomorphs also extends into Mexico, as in Baja California about a quarter of identified prey was black-tailed jackrabbit and either desert or the larger Mexican cottontail (Sylvilagus cunicularius).

In the northern boreal forest, great horned owls are even more dependent on the snowshoe hare. At the peak of the 10-year hare cycle, snowshoe hares were by far the largest component of both summer and winter diets (77–81% and 90–99%, respectively, in Alberta; 83–86% and 75–98%, respectively, in Yukon). At the lowest point of the hare's cycle, summer diets consisted of only 0–16% snowshoe hare in Alberta and 12.7% in Yukon. When hares were scarce, great horned owls in these regions fed mostly on large rodents, mice and voles, grouse and ducks. Because fewer of these alternative prey species are available in boreal forests during winter, owls had to emigrate or suffer high mortalities if they stayed. In Alberta, the local population of great horned owls can increase threefold from hare population lows to peaks. The dependency on the snowshoe hare by the great horned owl extends into Alaska as well.

=== Other mammals ===
Other mammals are taken readily as well. Several species of mammalian carnivore, such as ringtails (Bassariscus astutus), American minks (Neogale vison), American martens (Martes americana), black-footed ferret (Mustela nigripes) and various other small mustelids (Mustela ssp.), are sometimes taken as prey. In one case, a great horned owl was the likely killer of an adult female fisher (Martes pennanti), though young ones are typically taken. Prey in the form of canids, like foxes or coyotes (Canis latrans) are often juveniles presumably snatched from the mouths of dens by night. Kit and swift foxes of up to adult size may be taken.

The most regular predatory association amongst relatively larger carnivores is that with skunks. Due to their poor sense of smell, great horned owls are the only predators to routinely attack these bold mammals with impunity. All six skunk species found in North America are reported as prey, including full-grown striped skunks (Mephitis mephitis), which can be three times as heavy as the attacking owl. In one single nest, the remains of 57 striped skunks were found. Due to the proclivity of skunk predation, great horned owls nests frequently smell strongly of skunk and occasionally stink so powerfully of skunk that they leave the smell at kill sites or on prey remains. Surprisingly, at least two cases of a great horned owl preying on an adult raccoon (Procyon lotor) have been reported. One instance of an owl taking a bobcat (Lynx rufus) as prey was also reportedly observed. Occasionally, domestic carnivores are also prey. A few cases of young or small dogs (Canis lupus familiaris) and several of juvenile and adult cats (Felis silvestris catus) being killed by great horned owls have been reported.

Aside from carnivorans, various other mammals are taken as supplemental prey. At least eight species of shrews are taken by opportunity and make up the smallest mammalian prey taken by great horned owls, as specimens of least shrew (Cryptotis parva) or masked shrew (Sorex cinereus) have had an estimated weight of only 2 g (0.071 oz). One of the more regularly taken shrews, though, is the larger 19.5 g (0.69 oz) northern short-tailed shrew (Blarina brevicauda), which was represented in more than 2% of pellets in the Upper Midwest. Moles, of at least four or five species, are also widely but lightly reported as prey. From both the tropics and the United States, several species of opossum may be taken, down to the size of the tiny dwarf fat-tailed mouse opossum (Thylamys velutinus). North American subspecies can prey on larger Virginia opossum (Didelphis virginianus) readily, and can be a major predator of this species. Remnants of armadillo, presumably nine-banded armadillo (Dasypus novemcinctus), have been found around owl nests in the south. 11 species of bat are known to be hunted by great horned owls. One pellet in Texas was found to be composed entirely of Mexican free-tailed bats (Tadarida brasiliensis).

=== Birds ===
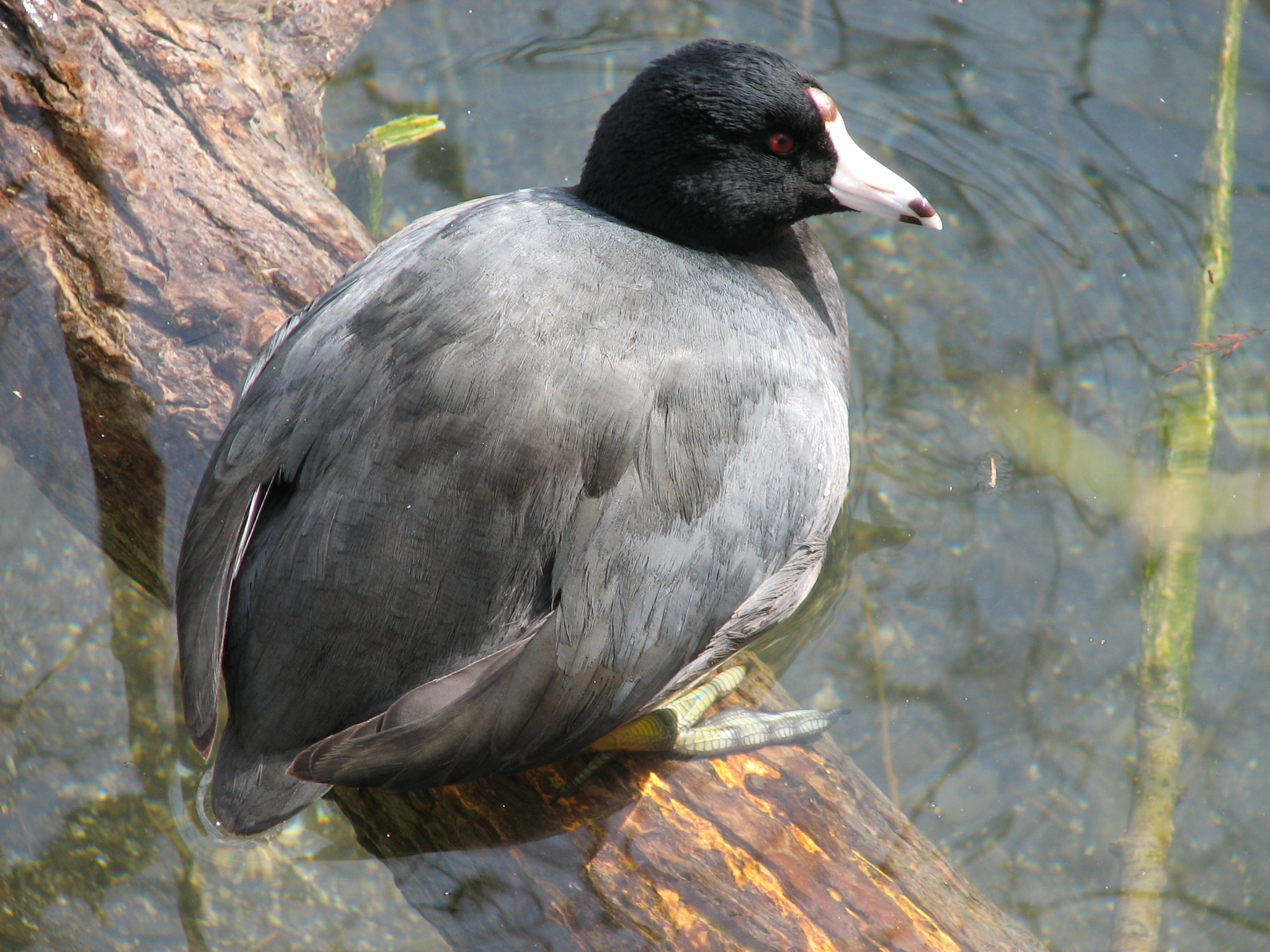
American coots are often a favored food source for great horned owls living near wetlands.

After mammals, birds rank as the next most important general prey group. Birds are usually considerably secondary in the diet but outnumber the mammals in the diet by diversity, as more than 250 species have been killed in North America alone. Statistically, the most significant avian prey seems to be galliforms, of which they are known to have preyed on 23 species, basically consisting of all of the native species found in the United States. In the Upper Midwest, the ring-necked pheasant (Phasianus colchicus) and northern bobwhite (Colinus virginianus) were the fifth and sixth (out of 124 identified species) most significant prey species in 4838 pellets. Errington characterized the predatory pressure exerted on bobwhites by great horned owls as "light but continuous pressure", which may be considered characteristic of the species' hunting of all galliforms.

Usually coveys of quail are partially protected by spending the night roosting communally in dense thickets but should a hunting owl be able to track down the communal roost, losses can be fairly heavy until the roost relocates. Similarly, owls may track down sleeping grouse, which also roost in vegetation but more openly than quail. Some grouse, such as greater prairie-chicken (Tympanuchus cupido), sharp-tailed grouse (Tympanuchus phasianellus) and greater sage-grouse (Centrocercus urophasianus), may also been vulnerable to great horned owls while displaying conspicuously in openings on a lek first thing in the morning. In the boreal forest, especially in years where the snowshoe hare experiences population decreases, great horned owls prey fairly heavily (approximately 25% of biomass) on ruffed grouse (Bonasa umbellus) and spruce grouse (Falcipennis canadensis), enough so in the earlier bird to possibly contribute to population reductions. Larger species of galliform are not immune to predation either. On Protection Island in Washington state, introduced common peafowl (Pavo cristatus) are an important prey item. The wild turkey (Meleagris gallopavo), 4 to 8 kg (8.8 to 17.6 lb) on average between the sexes, is probably the largest bird the great horned owl hunts in which they kill adults. Both full-grown wild turkeys and adult domestic turkeys have been hunted and killed. Under normal circumstances, domestic chicken (Gallus gallus domesticus) will be ignored in favor of wild prey. On occasion, individual owls, especially inexperienced juveniles, will become habitual fowl killers. These errant owls mainly hunt chickens, though will also take domestic guineafowl, turkeys and anything else available. In general, chickens kept in locked cages with enclosed tops overnight are safe from great horned owls; not so chickens left free range or in open enclosures.

While galliforms are widely reported, the few cases where great horned owls locally turn to birds as the primary food source over mammals, these may often be local responses to the abundance of breeding water birds or concentrations of roosting water birds, since they tend to roost in relatively open spots. They have been known to predate more than 110 different species of assorted water bird. In prairie wetlands of North Dakota, avian prey, primarily represented by ducks and the American coot (Fulica americana) came to represent 65% by number and 83% by biomass of the diet of the local owls, also including secondarily grebes, smaller rails, loons, shorebirds and seabirds, as well as upland-based species like grey partridge (Perdix perdix), sharp-tailed grouse and passerines. 77% of the ducks in that study were juveniles, the largest duck being a male mallard (Anas platyrhnychos) weighing approximately 1,250 g (2.76 lb), but nearly all the coots were adults. On Protection Island, Washington, where they are no native land mammals, rhinoceros auklets (Cerorhinca monocerata), both adults and nestlings, were the most numerous prey, present in 93% of 120 pellets. Species as large as adult Canada geese, snow goose and great blue herons have been successfully killed. Medium-sized birds of prey (even other species of owl) are also taken. The nestlings of even larger species like trumpeter swans (Cygnus buccinator), American white pelicans (Pelecanus eryhtrorhynchos), brown pelicans (Pelecanus occidentalis) and sandhill cranes (Grus canadensis) have also been killed by these owls.

Other assorted birds are taken seemingly at random opportunity. The predatory effect of this species on other raptorial birds, which is often considerable, is explored in the following section. Although not usually numerically significant, 86 species of passerine have been taken by great horned owls. Members from most North American families are known as prey, although among smaller types such as chickadees, warblers, sparrows, cardinalids, wrens and most tyrant flycatchers only a few species from each have been recorded. Nonetheless, an occasionally unlucky migrant or local breeder is sometimes snatched. Fledgling songbirds are regularly taken in spring and summer. The smallest avian prey known for great horned owls are the 5.8 g (0.20 oz) blue-grey gnatcatcher (Polioptila caerulea) and the 6.2 g (0.22 oz) ruby-crowned kinglet (Regulus calendula). Somewhat larger bodied families are more prominent, i.e. the corvids (14 species) and icterids (14 species) and, secondarily, the kingbirds (Tyrannus ssp.), thrushes, mimids and European starling (Sturnus vulgaris). This is likely due to the fact that the larger passerines usually roost in relatively open spots and have larger, more conspicuous nests. Crows and ravens tend to be grabbed off of their communal roosts by night.

=== Other prey ===
The great horned owl rarely misses an opportunity to hunt reptiles and amphibians. However, lizards are largely unavailable as prey due to their typically diurnal periods of activity. However, some snakes are partially or largely nocturnal, and more than a dozen species are hunted in North America. Snakes hunted range from small, innocuous garter snakes (Thamnophis ssp.) and night snakes (Hypsiglena torquata) to venomous species like cottonmouths (Agkistrodon piscivorus) and prairie rattlesnakes (Crotalus virdis) and formidable, large species like common king snakes (Lampropeltis getula) and black rat snakes (Pantherophis obsoletus), which in mature specimens can rival the owl in mass and sheer predatory power. The capture of the hatchlings of very large reptiles such as loggerhead turtles (Caretta caretta) and American alligators (Alligator mississippiensis) by great horned owls has been reported, in both cases likely when the baby reptiles are attempting to make their way to the security of water. On rare occasion, salamanders, frogs and toads are reported as prey. On rare occasions, fish are taken including goldfish (Carassius auratus), bluegill (Lepomis macrochirus), bullheads (Ameiurus ssp.), other catfish, suckers, sunfish, eels and dace and chub.

Many types of invertebrates are recorded as prey. These include mainly insects, but also crayfish, crabs, centipedes, spiders, scorpions and worms. The occasionally invertebrate prey taken largely consists of common, large insects such as various beetles, crickets, grasshoppers, water bugs and katydids, some of which the great horned owl has even reportedly caught via "hawking", i.e. swooping at on the wing. In some cases, the content of insects in great horned owl pellets may actually be due to the owls eating other birds which have freshly eaten insects in their own stomachs. It is commonly believed that routine insectivory in great horned owls is mainly restricted to inexperienced young owls too unskilled to graduate to larger prey yet. It is clearly inefficient for owls of this size to attempt to raise young on a diet of foods as small as insects. Although rare, carrion-feeding has been recorded in great horned owls, especially ones wintering in Canada and other northern areas during harsh weather. Road kills are sometimes opportunistically eaten. A case of an owl scavenging a white-tailed deer (Odocoileus virginianus) carcass, ultimately tearing off the deer's leg, was captured on a motion capture video camera set out to film wildlife.

=== Urban vs rural diet ===
Studies comparing the diets of rural and urban great horned owls have identified that the most abundant rodent prey in their environment fulfils the majority of their diet. A study of food niche overlap between closely nested barn and great horned owls living in rural north-eastern Oregon identified voles as by far the most common prey. In southwestern British Columbia, Townsend's voles were the most common prey species, while consumption of rats increased as the nesting location became more urban and rats replaced voles as the most abundant and stable food source. A similar focus on rats was found in populations in urban parks in Seattle. Although a stable and highly abundant food source, a diet consisting of primarily rats can be harmful to urban great horned owls due to bioaccumulation of rodenticides.

=== Interspecific predatory relationships ===
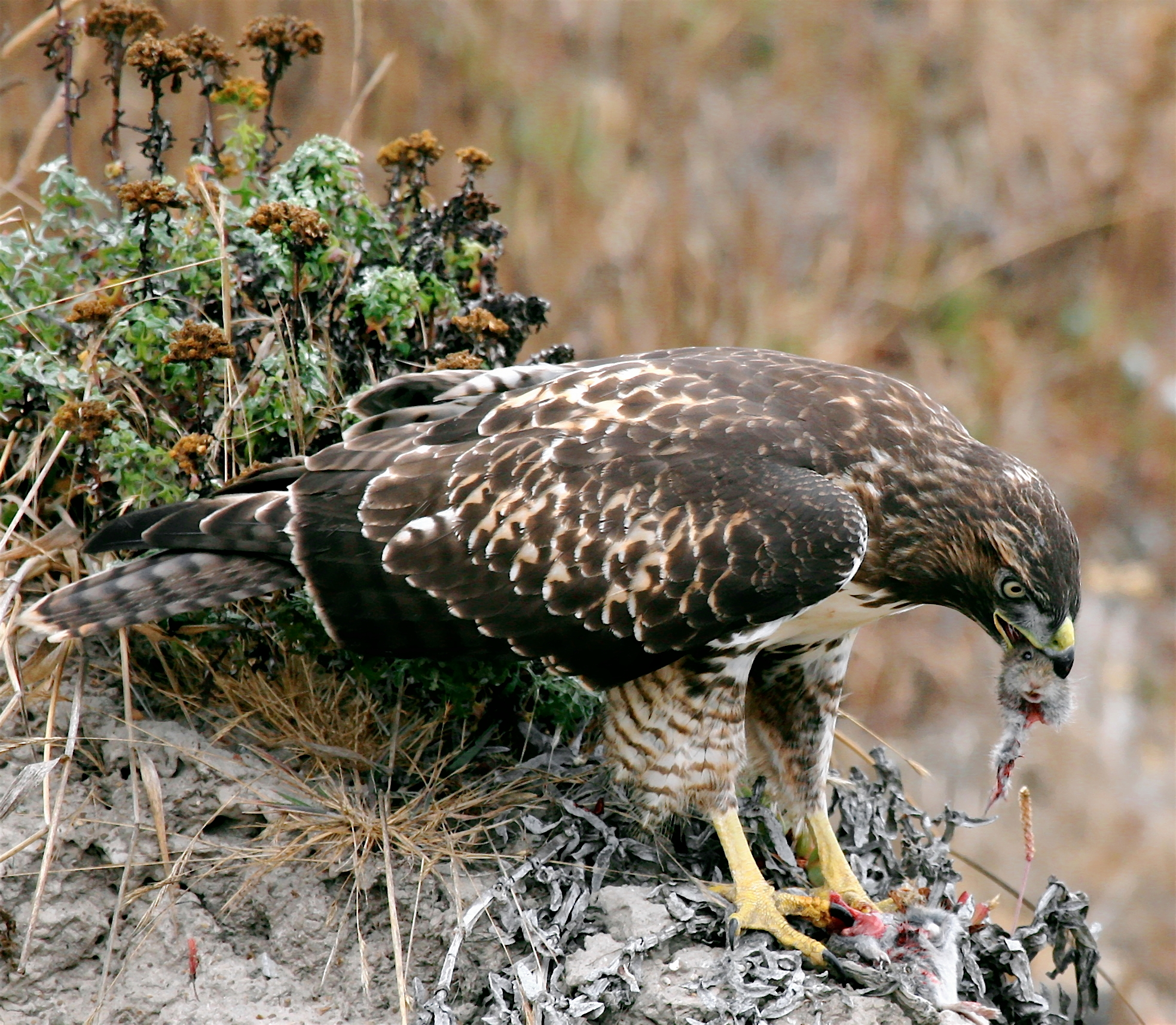
An immature red-tailed hawk eats a vole, one of the many prey items that feed both the competing hawks and great horned owls.

Due to their very broad dietary habits, the great horned owls share their prey with many other predators, including avian, mammalian and reptilian ones. Almost every study comparing the diets of North American owls illustrates the considerable overlap in the dietary selection of these species, as all species, besides the primarily insectivorous varieties, rely on many of the same small rodent species for most of their diet, extending from the small northern saw-whet owl and eastern screech owl to the great horned and great grey owls.

In a long-term study of a block of Michigan, all nine species of accipitrid, falcon and owl that stayed to breed there were found to be primarily dependent on the same two rodent genera, the meadow vole and the two common Peromyscus species. In the Great Basin, the owls share black-tailed jackrabbit and desert cottontail as the primary prey with golden eagles, red-tailed hawks and ferruginous hawks (Buteo regalis); all four species had diets with more than 90% of the biomass is made up of those lagomorphs. Of these, the great horned owl and golden eagle were able to nest most closely to one another because they had the most strongly dissimilar periods of activity. In California, when compared to the local red-tailed hawks and western diamondback rattlesnakes (Crotalus atrox), the diets were most similar in that by number about 15–20% of all three species' diets depended on cottontails, but the largest portion was made up of ground squirrels in the hawk and the rattlesnake and desert woodrats and other assorted rodents in the great horned owl. In the boreal forests, the great horned owl's prolificacy as a snowshoe hare hunter places it second only to the Canada lynx (Lynx canadensis) among all predators. Although locally dependent on the hares as their main food, northern goshawks (Accipiter gentilis), red-tailed hawks and golden eagles apparently do not have as large of an impact on the hares, nor do mammalian carnivore generalists that also kill many hares, like the fisher, bobcat, wolverine (Gulo gulo), coyote and larger varieties (i.e. wolves (Canis lupus), cougars (Puma concolor) and bears (Ursus ssp.)).

The relationship between great horned owls and other raptorial birds in its range is usually decidedly one-sided. While certain species, such as the red-tailed hawk and northern goshawk, might be seen as potential competition for the owls, most others seem to be regarded merely as prey by great horned owls. The great horned owl is both the most prolific and diverse predator in America of other birds of prey, with other accomplished raptor-hunters such as the goshawk and the golden eagle being more restricted in range, habitat and number in North America and thus having a more minor impact. All studies have found raptors are a small portion of this owl's diet but predation can be seriously detrimental for such prey, as raptors tend to be territorial and sparsely distributed as a rule and thus can be effectively decimated by a small number of losses. In the gray hawk (Buteo plagiatus), for example, in a study of one breeding block of Arizona, the owls were observed to visit nests nightly until all the nestlings were gone.

Raptorial birds in general tend to have large, conspicuous nests which may make them easier for a hunting owl to locate. The great horned owl gains an advantage by nesting earlier than any other raptor in its range (indeed any bird), as it is able to exploit the other raptors as food while in a more vulnerable state as their own nestlings have become well developed. On average, great horned owls begin nesting about three weeks before red-tailed hawks begin to build nests, although some raptors may locally breed as much as two months after the owls.

More so than diurnal varieties of raptor, fairly significant numbers of owls are hunted, as all species are to some extent nocturnal and thus their corresponding activity can attract the horned owl's unwanted attention. The extent of predation on other owls depends on the habitat preferences of the other species. Eastern and western screech owls may be most vulnerable since they prefer similar wooded edge habitat. In a block of Wisconsin, great horned owls were responsible for the failure of 78% of eastern screech owl's nests. Long-eared owls and, to a lesser extent, barn owls tend to hunt in open, sparsely treed habitats more so than great horned owls, but since they may return to wooded spots for nesting purposes, they may be more vulnerable there. The long-eared owl and barn owls are often compared to the great horned owl as these medium-sized species often occur in abutting habitats and often hunt primarily the same vole and mice species, although the alternate prey of the great horned tends to be much larger, including the smaller owls themselves. In a pair of studies from Colorado, the average weight of prey for long-eared owls was 28 to 30 g (0.99 to 1.06 oz), 46 to 57.1 g (1.62 to 2.01 oz) for barn owl and 177 to 220 g (6.2 to 7.8 oz) for the great horned owl.

Both young and adult great grey owls, despite their superficially superior size, are apparently hunted with impunity by great horned owls. In the boreal forests, both the northern hawk owl and great grey owl appear to be in greater danger of great horned owl predation in years where the snowshoe hare have low populations. Great horned owls were the leading cause of mortality in juvenile spotted owls (30% of losses) and juvenile great grey owls (65% of losses). Less is known about relations with the snowy owl, which may compete with great horned owls for food while invading south for the winter. Anecdotally, both snowy and great horned owls have rarely been reported to dominate or even kill one another depending on the size and disposition of the individual owls, although the snowy's preference for more open areas again acts as something of a buffer. The snowy may be the one North American owl too formidable for the great horned owl to consider as prey.

Whereas owls of any age are freely attacked by great horned owls whether nesting or not, when it comes to diurnal raptors, great horned owls are mainly a danger around the nest. They often hunt diurnal raptors when they come across their often relatively conspicuous active platform nests during hunting forays in spring and summer, taking numbers of both nestlings and brooding adults. Again, like owls, diurnal raptors are attacked depending on the relative similarity of their habitat preferences to the owl. Cooper's hawks (Accipiter cooperii) and red-tailed hawks tend to be most vulnerable, as they prefer the same wooded edges frequented by great horned owls. Other diurnal raptors may be attracted to more enclosed wooded areas, such as sharp-shinned hawks (Accipiter striatus) or zone-tailed hawks (Buteo albonotatus), or more open plain and meadow areas, such as Northern harriers (Circus hudsonius) and ferruginous hawks, but this is almost never a total insurance against predation as all of these are recorded prey.

In a study of red-shouldered hawk (Buteo lineatus) and broad-winged hawk (Buteo brachyurus) breeding in New York, despite their nesting in deeper woods than those that host these owls, the main cause of nest failure was great horned owl predation. Similarly, the great horned owl was the primary cause of nesting failure for both desert-dwelling Harris's hawks (Parabuteo unicinctus) and forest-dwelling northern goshawk in Arizona (39% and 40% of failures, respectively), wetland-inhabiting osprey (Pandion haliaetus) in Delaware (21% of failures) and peregrine falcons (Falco peregrinus) in the Western United States (27% of failures). The fact that many of the nests great horned owls use are constructed by accipitrids may lead to localized conflicts, almost always to the detriment of the hawks rather than the owls. While the young of larger diurnal raptors are typically stolen in the night, great horned owls also readily kill large adult raptors both in and out of breeding seasons, including osprey, northern goshawk and rough-legged buzzard.

Great horned owls are frequently mobbed by other birds. Most accipitrids will readily mob them, as will falcons. Hen harriers, northern goshawks, Cooper's hawks, Harris's hawks, red-tailed hawks, Swainson's hawks, ferruginous hawks, red-shouldered hawks, American kestrels, peregrine falcons, prairie falcons (Falco mexicanus) and common ravens (Corvus corax) are among the reported species who have been recorded diving on great horned owls when they discover them. In Arizona and Texas, they may be mobbed by Mexican jays and western scrub jays (Aphelocoma wollweberi & californica) and western and Cassin's kingbirds (Tyrannus verticalis & vociferans). In addition, there are several documented incidences of American crows mobbing a great horned owl, in groups of dozens or even hundreds of crows. In response to mobbing, if the owl flies it alights to the nearest secluded spot. If an owl alights on ground or on exposed branch or ledge, it may respond to swooping and stooping flights of corvids and raptors with threat display and raising of its wings.

== Reproduction ==
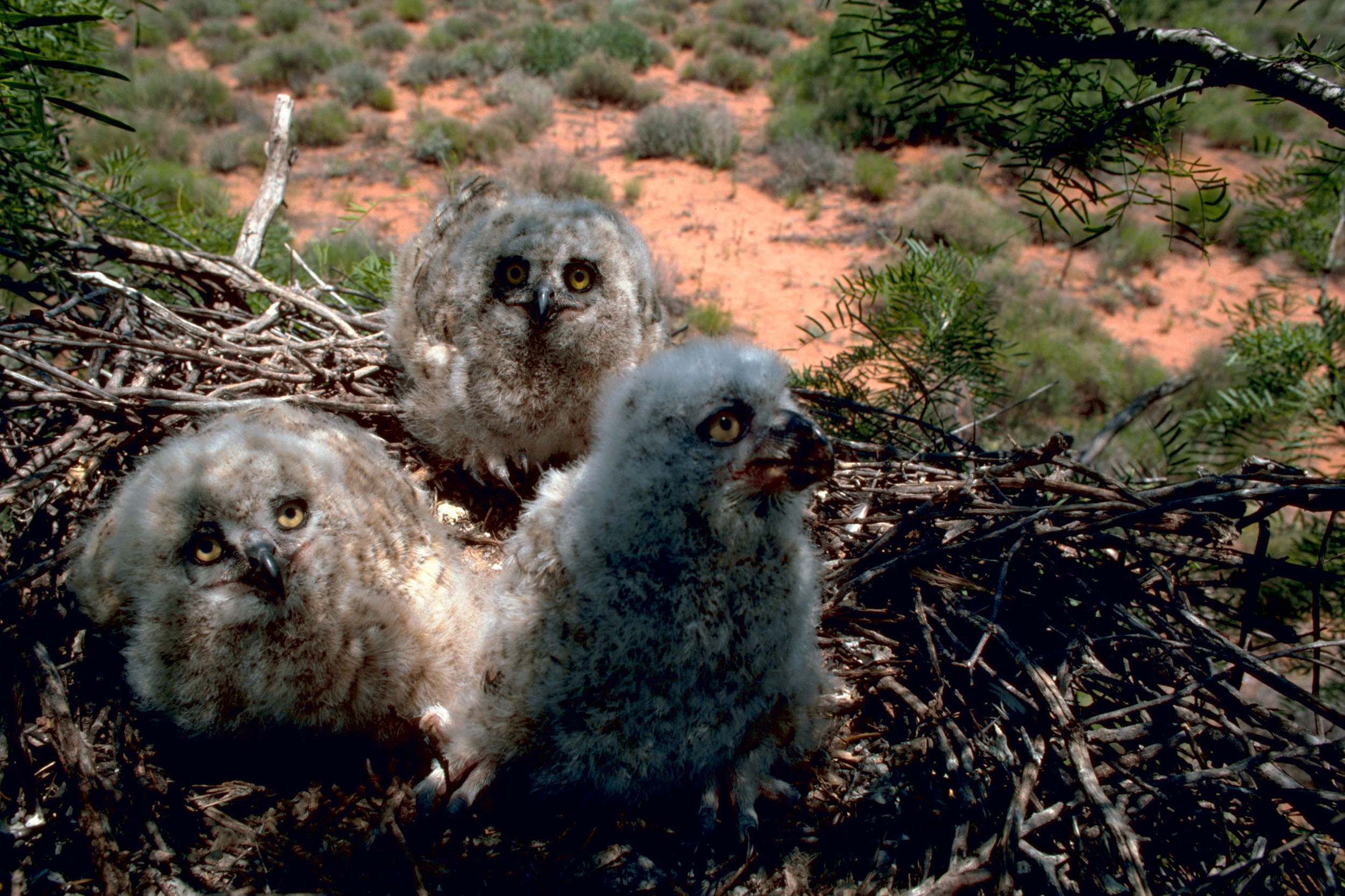
Nestlings of the Rocky Mountains great horned owl (B. v. pinorum) in New Mexico

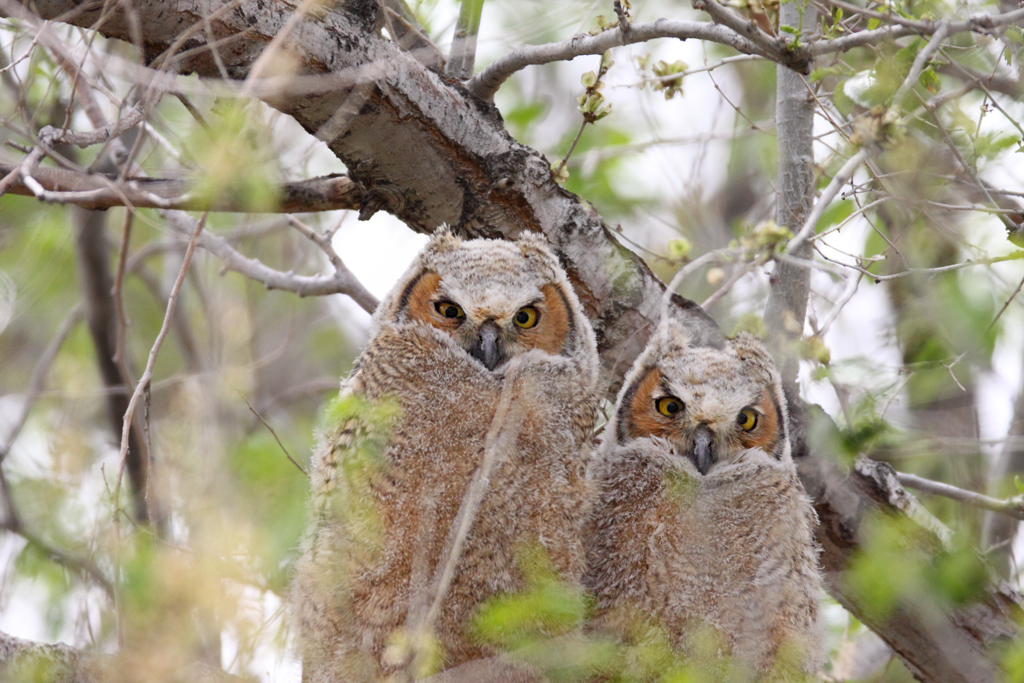
Juvenile coastal great horned owls (B. v. saturatus) near Tule Lake National Wildlife Refuge, Oregon, United States

Great horned owls are some of the earliest-breeding birds in North America, seemingly in part because of the lengthy nightfall at this time of year and additionally the competitive advantage it gives the owl over other raptors. In most of North America, courtship is from October to December and mates are chosen by December to January. This species was once thought to be strictly monogamous, but recent analysis indicates one male may mate with two females simultaneously, as was discovered for the first time in 2018 in Reno, Nevada. During courtship in late fall or early winter, the male attracts the attention of his mate by hooting emphatically while leaning over (with the tail folded or cocked) and puffing up his white throat to look like a ball. The white throat may serve as a visual stimulus in the low light conditions typical of when this owl courts. He often flies up and down on a perch, while approaching the potential mate. Eventually, he comes to approach the female and tries to rub his bill against hers while repeatedly bowing. If receptive, the female hoots back when the pair meet but is more subdued in both her hoot and display. The male may convince the female by bringing her freshly caught prey, which they will share. While males often hoot emphatically for about a month or six weeks towards the end of the year, the period where females also hoot is usually only a week to ten days. Pairs typically breed together year after year and may mate for life, although they associate with each other more loosely when their young become mostly independent. Pairs rekindling their reproductive relationship in the winter may perform a milder courtship to strengthen pair bonds before producing young.

Males select nesting sites and bring the females' attention to them by flying to the nest and then stomping on it. Considering the owls' large size, nests with open access are preferred to those enclosed with surrounding branches. Like all owls, great horned owls do not build their own nest. Great horned owls tend to examine an area for an abandoned nest, generally from larger birds like hawks, and take over the nest for raising their own young. They nest in a wider variety of sites than any other North American bird. Many nests are in cavernous hollows of dead trees or their branches, and especially in southern states in large trees along the edge of old-growth lots. In mountainous or hilly areas, especially in canyons of the Southwest and Rocky Mountains, cliff ledges, small caves, and other sheltered depressions may be used. Owls living in prairie country, in the absence of other animals' nests, riparian tree-hollows or man-made structures, will use boulders, buttes, railroad cuts, low bushes and even the bare ground as nest sites. Ground nests have also been recorded in the midst of tall grasses in Florida and in the midst of brushy spots on desert ground. Even the burrow entrances of American badger and coyote dens have reportedly been used as nests, in spite of the inherent risk of sharing space with such potentially dangerous co-inhabitants. Nesting behavior for the great horned owl appears to be more closely related to prey availability than it does to seasonal conditions. There has been some evidence that if prey availability is low enough then the species may forgo mating entirely for a season. Male and female owls of the species have been observed to help incubate the eggs once they have been laid on a nest.

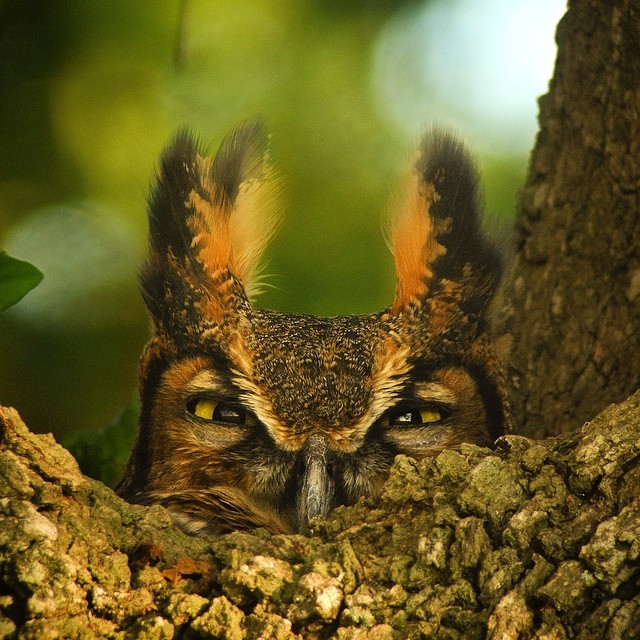
A brooding female common great horned owl (B. v. virginianus) on her nest in Louisiana

Most tree nests used by great horned owls are constructed by other animals, often from a height of about 4.5 to 22 m (15 to 72 ft) off the ground. They often take over a nest used by some other large bird, sometimes adding feathers to line the nest but usually not much more. Allegedly there have some cases where the owls have reinforced a nest structure or appeared to have reconstructed a nest, but as a rule no owl species has ever been known to actually build a nest. Great horned owls in the Southwest may also use nests in cacti, built by Harris's hawk and red-tailed hawk, as well as large hollows in cacti. The nests they use are often made by most larger types of acciptrids, from species as small as Cooper's hawks to bald eagle and golden eagle, though perhaps most often those of red-tailed hawks and other buteonines. Secondly in popularity are crow and raven (Corvus ssp.) nests. Even Canada goose, black-crowned night heron (Nycticorax nycticorax) and great blue heron nests have been used, the latter sometimes right in the midst of an active heronry. The leaf nests of squirrels are also regularly used but in general great horned owls are partial to stick nests since they provide a much firmer, safer foundation.

The stage at which eggs are laid is variable across North America. In Southern Florida, eggs may be laid as early as late November to as late as early January. In the southeast, from south Texas to Georgia, egg laying may begin from late December to early February. From Southern California to northern Louisiana, egg laying is from early February to late March. The largest swath of egg-laying owls from central California to South Carolina to as far north as Ohio and Massachusetts is from late February to early April. In the Rocky Mountains, Northwestern United States, northern New England and eastern Canada, egg laying is from early March to late April. In the rest of Canada and Alaska, egg laying may be from late March to early May. The latest known date of egg laying was in mid-June in Saskatchewan and the Yukon Territory. In northwestern Utah and north-central Alberta, egg-laying can be 3–4 weeks earlier than usual when food is abundant and weather is favorable. For owls found in more tropical climates, the dates of the breeding season are somewhat undefined. There are usually 2 eggs per clutch, but clutches range in size from 1 to 6 eggs (over 3 is uncommon, over 4 is very rare), depending on environmental conditions. The average egg width is 46.5 mm (1.83 in), the average length is 55 mm (2.2 in) and the average weight is 51 g (1.8 oz), although mass could be slightly higher elsewhere because this figure is from Los Angeles County, CA where the owls are relatively small. The incubation period ranges from 28 to 37 days, averaging 33 days. The female alone usually does all the incubation and rarely moves from the nest, while the male owl captures food and brings it to her, with the first nightly food delivery typically occurring soon after dark.

The young weigh 34.7 g (1.22 oz) at birth on average and can gain about 33 g (1.2 oz) a day for the first four weeks of life, with typical weights in the range of 800 or 1,000 g (1.8 or 2.2 lb) by 25–29 days for males and females, respectively. When first hatched the young are covered in whitish gray down, with some brownish about the wings. Gradually the soft juvenile downy plumage comes through the down, being typically a cinnamon-buff color, but with variable hues predicting the eventual color of the mature owls. The extent of down gradually diminishes, developing mature-looking plumage by late summer, although many first year birds still have scattered bits of down into autumn. By late autumn, first-year birds look similar to adults but with a slightly warmer, reddish tinge, less well developed ear tufts and a smaller white throat patch. The nestling owls develop mostly in behavior between two weeks and two months of age, in which time they adapt the ability to defend themselves, grasp foods and climb. Vocally, the young are able to exert weak chirps while still in the egg, developing into a raspy chirp shortly after hatching. The calls of the young increase rapidly in intensity, pitch and character, some juvenile males mimicking their father's hooting in fall but usually they conclude with various odd gurgling notes. The earliest competent hooting by juvenile owls is not until January. Young owls move onto nearby branches at 6 weeks and start to fly about a week later. However, the young are not usually competent fliers until they are about 10 to 12 weeks old. The age at which the young leave the nest is variable based on the abundance of food.

The young birds stay in an area ranging from 13 to 52 ha from the nest into fall, but will usually disperse up to several thousand hectares by the end of fall. The offspring have been seen still begging for food in late October (5 months after leaving the nest) and most do not fully leave their parents territory until right before the parents start to reproduce for the next clutch (usually December to January). Birds may not breed for another year or two, and are often vagrants ("floaters") until they establish their own territories. Based on the development of the bursa, great horned owls reach sexual maturity at two years of age.

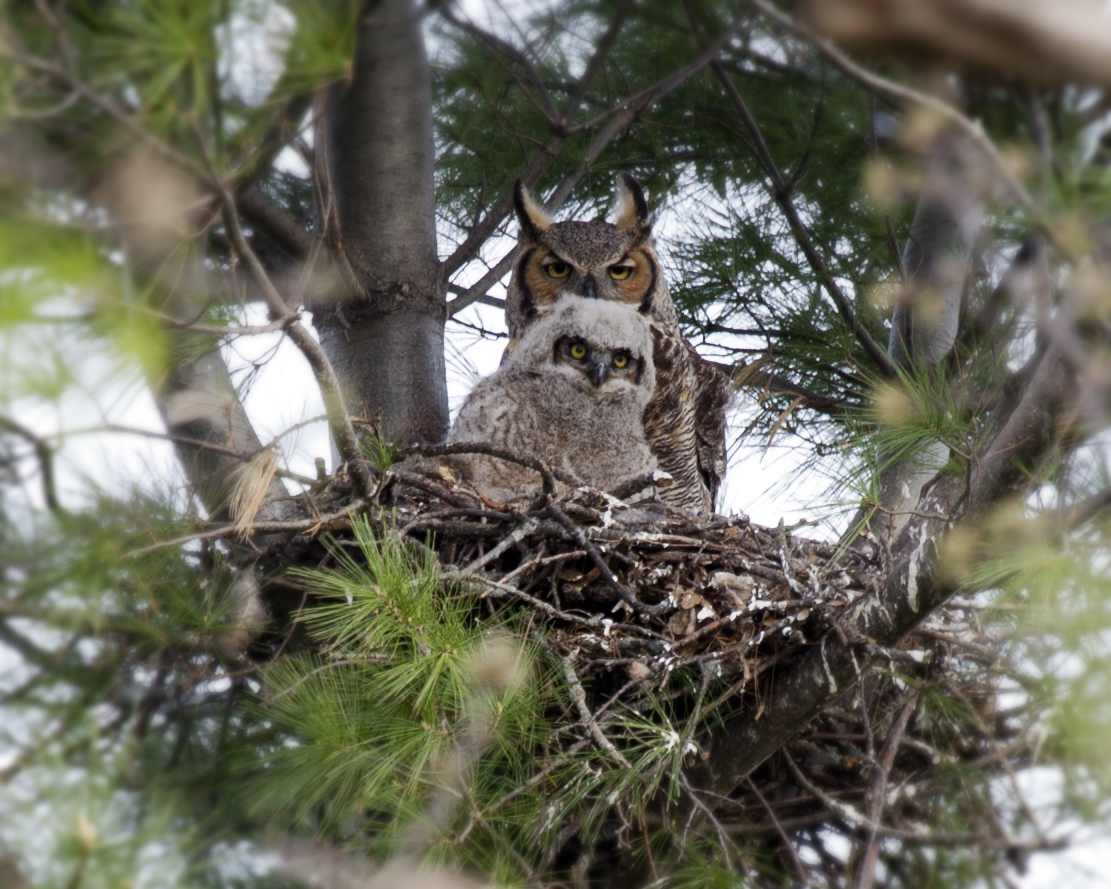
Adult common great horned owl (B. v. virginianus) with juvenile in nest near Madison, Wisconsin

=== Urban vs rural nesting ===
While urban and rural populations show little difference in productivity, there are differences in nest selection. Rural owls use old raptor nests more frequently than urban birds, who utilize crow or squirrel nests. Additionally, urban nesting individuals utilize trees that are taller/wider in diameter and nest much higher compared to rural nesting great horned owls. The reason behind this increased tree height is due to the fact that urban areas have large trees used for ornamentation, shade and shelter. The higher nesting within the taller trees was attributed to human avoidance. Both rural and urban nesting sites were often within range of paved roads, likely a result of the great horned owl's tendency to hunt along roadways.

Studies have shown that nesting in urban areas can influence adult great horned owls to lay eggs earlier than those who nest in rural areas. In Wisconsin, eggs in urban nests hatched a month earlier (January rather than February) than their counterparts in rural areas, probably due to increased protection from wind and cold. Nesting owls at sites in Winnipeg, Manitoba began nesting five to six weeks earlier than those in rural parts of Manitoba, presumably due to experiencing an extremely warm winter by Winnipeg's standards, as well as benefitting from the local urban heat island.

== Mortality and longevity ==
=== Longevity and natural mortality ===
Great horned owls seem to be the most long-lived owl in North America. Among all owls, they may outrank even the larger Eurasian eagle owl in known longevity records from the wild, with almost 29 years being the highest age for an owl recorded in North America. In captivity, the record for the longest lived great horned owl was 50 years. A more typical top lifespan of a great horned owl is approximately 13 years. In general, great horned owls are most vulnerable in the early stages of life, although few species press attacks on the owl's nests due to the ferocious defensive abilities of the parents. Occasionally, nestlings and fledglings will fall from the nest too early to escape or to competently defend themselves and fall prey to foxes, bobcat, coyotes, or wild or feral cats. Occasionally raccoons and American black bears consume eggs and nestlings from tree nests and Virginia opossum may take the rare unguarded egg. Crows and ravens have been reported eating eggs and small nestlings. This can normally only happen when owls are driven from the nest by human activity or are forced to leave the nest to forage by low food resources but on occasion huge flocks of crows have been able to displace owls by harassing them endlessly. In general, great horned owls rarely engage in siblicide, unlike many other raptorial birds. Siblicide occurred at 9 of 2,711 nests in Saskatchewan. Most cases where young owls are killed and/or consumed by their siblings or parents appear to occur when the nestling is diseased, impaired or starving or is inadvertently crushed. Adults generally have no natural predators, excepting both North American eagles and other owls of their own species.

Occasionally, great horned owls may be killed by their own prey. Although typically able to kill skunks without ill effect, five owls were found blind after getting sprayed in their eyes by skunks. Cases where the quills of porcupines have killed or functionally disabled them have been observed as well. Violent fights have been observed between great horned owls after attempts to capture rat snakes and black racers. When a peregrine falcon repeatedly attacked a great horned owl near its nest along the Hudson River, it was apparently unable to dispatch the larger raptor despite several powerful strikes. During their initial dispersal in fall, juvenile owls have a high mortality rate, frequently more than 50%. For owls in the Yukon Territory, juvenile survival in the 9 weeks after dispersal has dropped from 80% to 23.2% in a span of three years in response of instability of food supply. In the Yukon, adults on territory had an average annual survival rate of 90.5%. Anemia, caused by Leucocytozoon ziemanni and the drinking of blood by swarming, blood-drinking blackflies (Simulium ssp.), was a leading cause of juvenile mortality in the Yukon.

=== Human-related mortality ===
The great horned owl is not considered a globally threatened species by the IUCN. Including the Magellanic species, there are approximately 5.3 million wild horned owls in the Americas. Most mortality in modern times is human-related, caused by owls flying into man-made objects, including buildings, cars, power lines, or barbed wire. In one study, the leading causes of death for owls were collision with cars, entanglement with wires, flying into buildings and, lastly, electrocution. Among 209 banded nestlings in yet another study, 67% were found dead after independence: 56 were found shot, 41 were trapped, 15 hit by cars, 14 found dead on highways and 14 electrocuted by overhead power lines. Secondary poisoning from pest control efforts is widely reported variously due to anticoagulant rodenticides, strychnine, organophosphates (famphur applied topically to cattle (Bos primigenius taurus)), organochlorines, and PCBs.

Frequently, the species were denominated a pest due to the perceived threat it posed to domestic fowl and potentially small game. The first genuine nature conservationists, while campaigning against the "Extermination Being Waged Against the Hawks and Owls", continued to advocate the destruction of great horned owls due to their predatory effect on other wildlife. Thus, small bounties were offered in trade for owl bodies. Around the turn of the 20th century, the great horned owl was considered endangered in the state of Michigan because of the large number of poachers who were illegally hunting and collecting it. Hunting and trapping of great horned owls may continue on a small scale but is now illegal in most countries.

=== Effect on conservation-dependent species ===
Occasionally, these owls may prey on threatened species. Following the devastation to its populations from DDT, the reintroduction of the peregrine falcon to the Mississippi and Hudson Rivers was hampered by great horned owls killing both young and adult peregrines at night. Similarly, as mainly recorded in New England, attempts to reintroduce ospreys, after they were also hit hard by DDT, were affected by heavy owl predation on nestlings, and the owls were also recorded to take a large toll locally on the threatened colonies of roseate terns. Where clear-cutting occurs in old-growth areas of the Pacific Northwest, spotted owls have been badly affected by considerable great horned owl predation. While at least the ospreys and peregrines have rebounded admirably nonetheless, bird and mammal species that are much rarer overall sometimes fall prey to great horned owls, many in which even sporadic losses can be devastating. Among the species considered threatened, endangered or critically endangered by the IUCN which are also known to be killed by great horned owls are Townsend's ground squirrels (Urocitellus townsendii), Pacific pocket mice (Perognathus pacificus), giant kangaroo rats, Stephens' kangaroo rat (Dipodomys stephensi), black-footed ferrets, greater and lesser prairie-chickens, marbled murrelets (Brachyramphus marmoratus), ivory-billed woodpeckers, Florida scrub jays (Aphelocoma coerulescens), pinyon jays, Kirtland's warblers (Setophaga kirtlandii) and rusty blackbirds (Euphagus carolinus). The American Bird Conservancy's "green list" includes birds with considerable population declines (many classed as near threatened by the IUCN) or other immediate threats and/or restricted populations. Altogether, great horned owls hunt 50 different species from that list.

== Captivity ==
From experimentally raising young owls in captivity, Paul Lester Errington felt that they were a bird of "essentially low intelligence" that could only hunt when partially wild and instinctually driven by hunger to hunt whatever they first encounter. He showed captive birds that were provided strips of meat from hatching, rather than having to hunt or to simulate hunting to obtain food, had no capacity to hunt. On the contrary, William J. Baerg compared behaviorally his captive-raised great horned owls to parrots, which are famously intelligent birds, although not as often playful: "It knows its keeper and usually accepts whatever he wishes to do with a good deal of tolerance." Carl D. Marti disagrees with Errington's assessments, noting that their prey selection is not as "completely random as Errington suggested". He further notes that though great horned owls appear to "select their mammalian prey in general relation to the prey populations", cottontails seem to be selected as prey "out of relation to their population status".

Arthur C. Bent also noted the variability in temperaments of great horned owls to their handlers, some generally pleasant, though most are eventually aggressive. Most captive specimens, once mature, seem to resent attempts at contact and are often given to attacking their keepers. They will only follow cues when conditioned from an early age but rarely with the same level of success seen in some diurnal birds of prey trained for falconry or entertainment, although this does not necessarily correlate with intelligence as posited by Errington.

A male great horned owl and a female Eurasian eagle-owl produced an apparently healthy hybrid young at Dudley Zoo in England.

== Iconography and myth ==
Many warrior-based tribes of Native Americans admired the great horned owl for their "strength, courage and beauty". The Pima of the Southwest believed that owls were reincarnations of slain warriors who fly about by night. The Arikara of the Great Plains had mystic owl societies in which initiates were made to adorn a facial mask made of the wing and tail feathers of great horned owls. Some Native American nations regarded the great horned owl as a friendly spirit that could aid in matters of love, such as the Passamaquoddy of Maine, who felt the call of this species was a magical love flute designed to ignite human passions. The Hopi of the Southwest also associated this owl with fertility, albeit of a different kind: they believed the calling of the owls into summer predicted hot weather, which produced good peach crops. During the winter solstice, the Hopi performed a ceremony with great horned owl feathers in hopes of summoning the heat of summer. Tribes in New Mexico were known to use owl wing-feathers to produce arrows which could strike their enemies with a minimum of sound. The Zuni held owl feathers in their mouths hoping to gain some of the silence that owls use in ambushes while striking their own enemies from other tribes. The Iroquois felt the origin of the great horned owl was due to an unformed owl annoying Raweno, the almighty creator, while Raweno created the rabbit, causing Raweno to make the owl "covered with mud" (dark camouflage) and doomed to ceaselessly call "whoo whoo", which he used while harassing Raweno by night because Raweno was active during the day.

=== Provincial bird ===
The great horned owl is the provincial bird of Alberta.
