= Paramo horned owl =

- In Napo Province, Ecuador

Conservation status
- Not evaluated (IUCN 3.1)

Scientific classification
- Kingdom: Animalia
- Phylum: Chordata
- Class: Aves
- Order: Strigiformes
- Family: Strigidae
- Genus: Bubo
- Species: B. nigrescens

Binomial name
- Bubo nigrescens Berlepsch, 1884

Species of owl

The paramo horned owl (Bubo nigrescens) is a large owl in the family Strigidae that is found in the high Andes of Colombia, Ecuador and northwestern Peru. It was formerly considered to be a subspecies of the great horned owl (Bubo virginianus).

== Taxonomy ==
The paramo horned owl was formally described in 1884 by the German ornithologist Hans von Berlepsch based on a specimen collected by Józef Siemiradzki at an altitude of 10,000 ft (3,000 m) at Cechce in the Chimborazo province of western Ecuador. Berlepsch coined the binomial name Bubo nigrescens, where the specific epithet is Latin meaning "blackish".

This owl was formerly treated as a subspecies of the great horned owl (Bubo virginianus) but is now treated as a separate species based on a combination of vocal and genetic evidence. The species is monotypic: no subspecies are recognised.

== Description ==
This species is a large, dark owl with prominent ear tufts. It is predominantly grey in color and has a whitish throat-patch. It has bold, dark barring across the underparts and a mottled grey back. The males and females are similar in their plumage, but the female is noticeably larger.

This species resembles the tropical horned owl and is similar to the magellanic horned owl. However, it is much darker and the breast is much more blotched.
