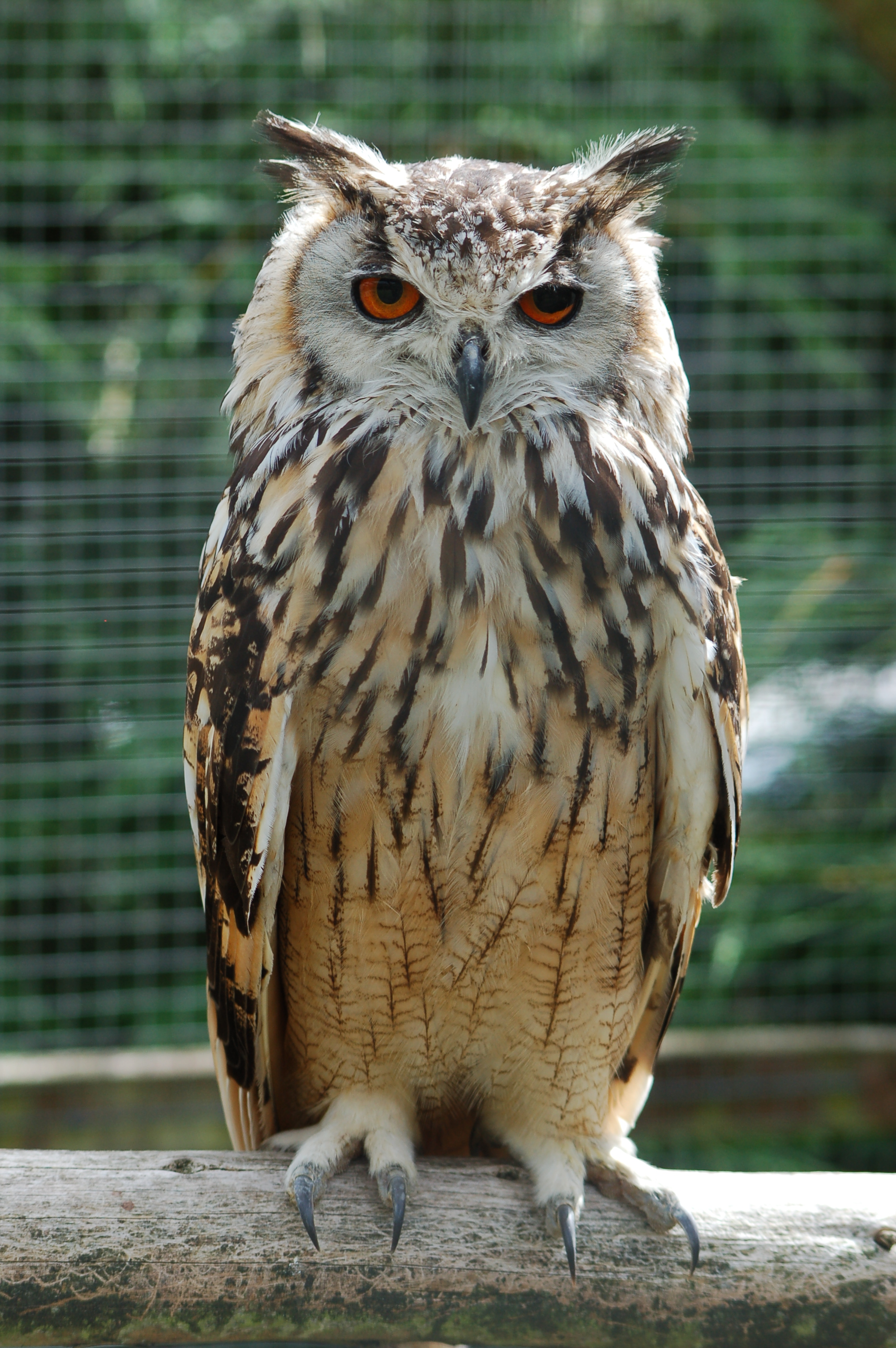
- Indian eagle-owl (Bubo bengalensis)

Scientific classification
- Kingdom: Animalia
- Phylum: Chordata
- Class: Aves
- Order: Strigiformes
- Family: Strigidae
- Genus: Bubo; Duméril, 1805

Type species
- Strix bubo Linnaeus, 1758

Species
- See text

Synonyms
- Huhua; Nyctea Stephens, 1826; Ophthalmomegas Dejaut, 1911; and see text

= Horned owl =

Horned owls and eagle-owls Temporal range: Late Pliocene to present

Genus of birds (Bubo)

The American (North and South America) horned owls and the Old World eagle-owls make up the genus Bubo, at least as traditionally described. The genus name Bubo is Latin for owl.

This genus contains 10 species that are found in many parts of the world. Some of the largest living Strigiformes are in Bubo. Traditionally, only owls with ear-tufts were included in this genus, but that is no longer the case.

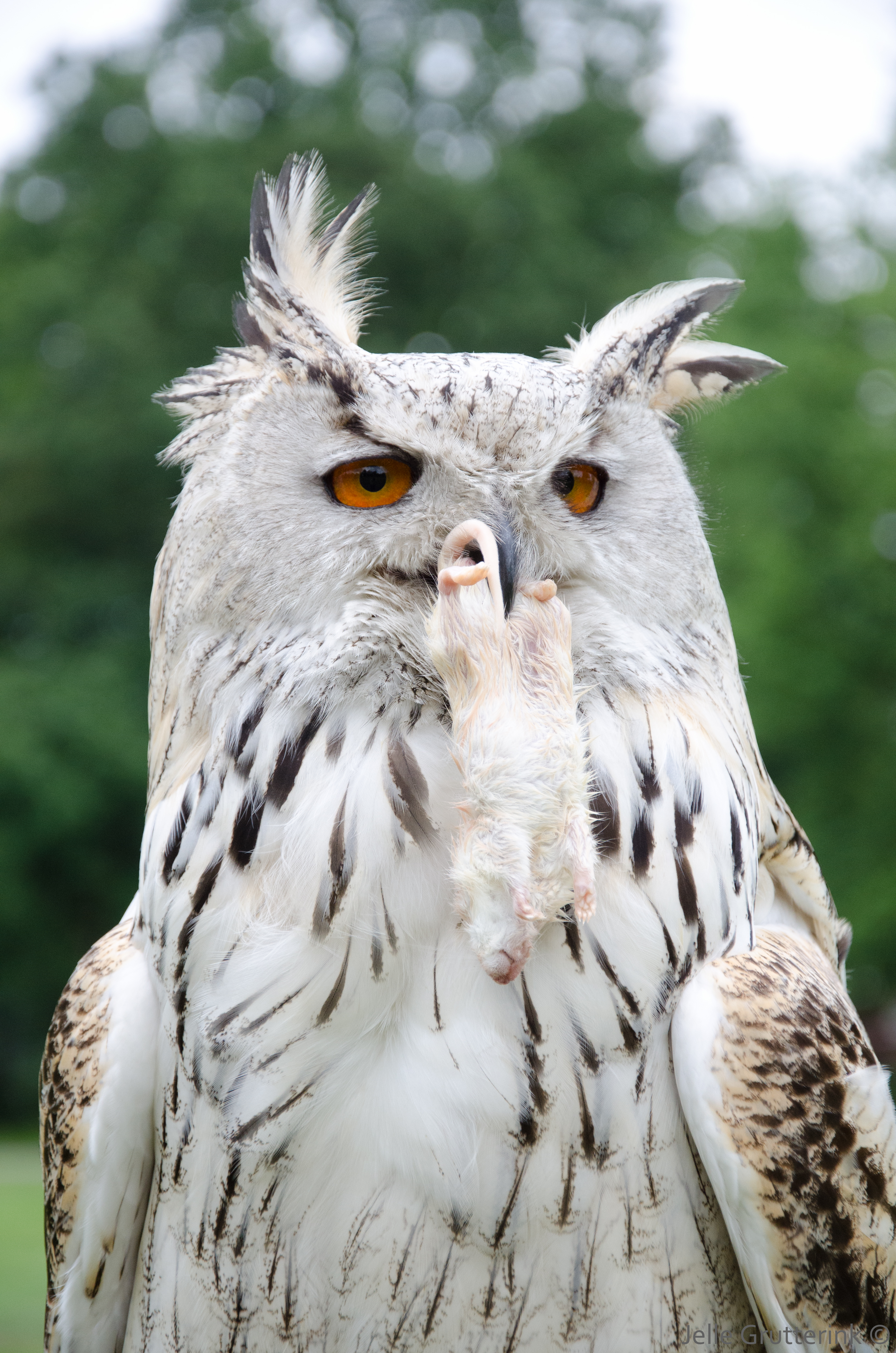
A Eurasian eagle-owl with a rat in its beak

== Taxonomy ==
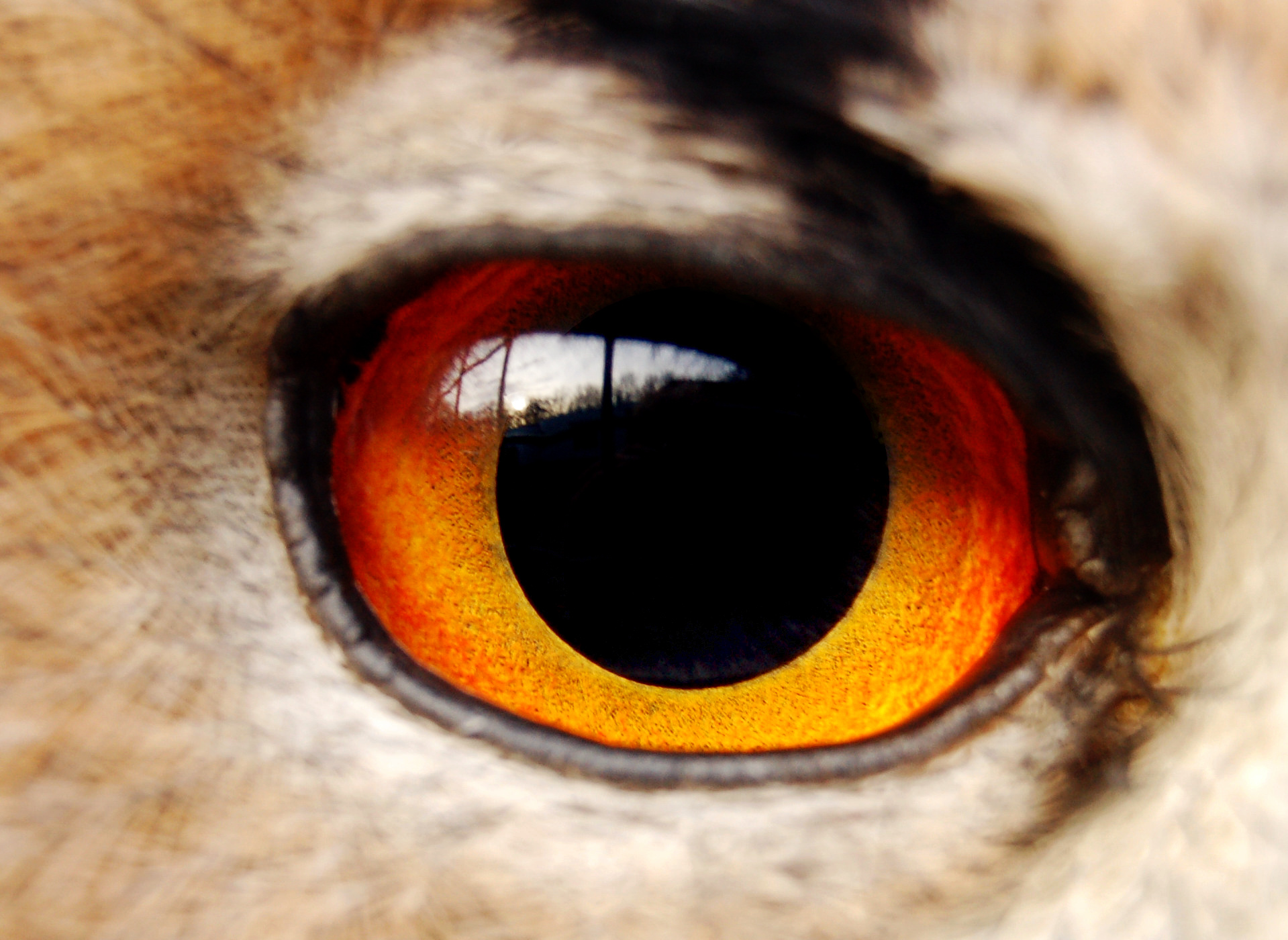
Detail of an eye of an eagle-owl

The genus Bubo was introduced in 1805 by the French zoologist André Duméril for the horned owls. The type species is the Eurasian eagle-owl. The word bubo is Latin for the Eurasian eagle owl and was used as the specific epithet for the species by Carl Linnaeus in 1758.

A molecular phylogenetic study published in 2020 found that species in the genera Scotopelia and Ketupa were embedded within the clade containing members of the genus Bubo making the genus Bubo paraphyletic. To create monophyletic genera, nine species were moved from Bubo to Ketupa.

=== Species ===
The genus contains 12 extant species:

- Snowy owl, Bubo scandiacus – widespread in north North America and north Palearctic
- Paramo horned owl, Bubo nigrescens – high Andes of Colombia to Ecuador and northwestern Peru (Piura province)
- Tropical horned owl, Bubo nacurutu – lowland South America, from northern Colombia eastward to the Guianas, and from southeastern Peru eastward to northeastern Brazil and northeastern Argentina
- Great horned owl, Bubo virginianus – widespread in the Americas
- Magellanic horned owl, Bubo magellanicus – central Peru to Tierra del Fuego
- Eurasian eagle-owl, Bubo bubo – widespread in the Palearctic
- Indian eagle-owl, Bubo bengalensis – Indian subcontinent
- Pharaoh eagle-owl, Bubo ascalaphus – northwest Africa to Arabian Peninsula
- Cape eagle-owl, Bubo capensis – south, southeast, east Africa
- Arabian eagle-owl, Bubo milesi – southwest Saudi Arabia and southwest Yemen, northeast Yemen and southwest Oman, and north Oman (south Arabian Peninsula)
- Greyish eagle-owl, Bubo cinerascens – Senegal and Gambia to Ethiopia and north Kenya
- Spotted eagle-owl, Bubo africanus – Africa south of Equator

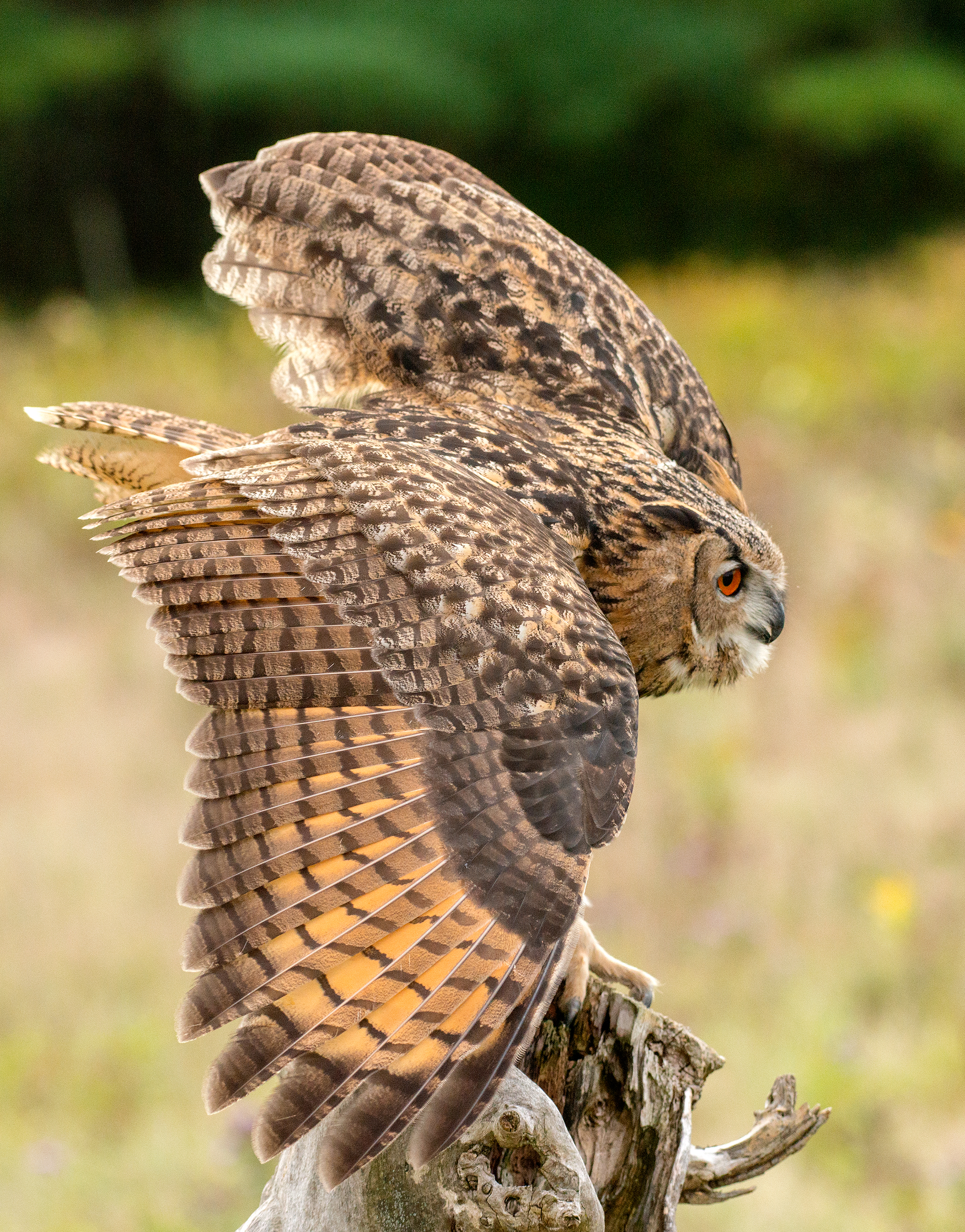
Eurasian eagle-owl (Bubo bubo)

Sometimes included in this genus:

- Verreaux's eagle-owl, Ketupa lactea
- Spot-bellied eagle-owl, Ketupa nipalensis
- Barred eagle-owl, Ketupa sumatrana
- Fraser's eagle-owl,Ketupa poensis
- Akun eagle-owl, Ketupa leucosticta
- Philippine eagle-owl, Ketupa philippensis
- Dusky eagle-owl, Ketupa coromanda
- Shelley's eagle-owl, Ketupa shelleyi
- Blakiston's fish owl, Ketupa blakistoni
- Brown fish owl, Ketupa zeylonensis
- Tawny fish owl, Ketupa flavipes
- Buffy fish owl, Ketupa ketupu
- Pel's fishing owl, Scotopelia peli
- Rufous fishing owl, Scotopelia ussheri
- Vermiculated fishing owl, Scotopelia bouvieri

=== Fossil record ===
Named and distinct Bubo species are:

- Bubo florianae (Late Miocene of Csákvár, Hungary, tentatively placed here)
- Bubo leakeyae (Early Pleistocene of Tanzania)
- Bubo binagadensis (Late Pleistocene of Binagady, Azerbaijan)
- Bubo osvaldoi (Pleistocene of Cuba)
- Bubo insularis (Pleistocene of Sardinia)

Some notable undescribed fossils of prehistoric horned owls, usually quite fragmentary remains, have also been recorded:

- Bubo sp. (Late Pliocene of Senèze, France)
- Bubo sp. (Late Pliocene of Rębielice Królewskie, Poland; tentatively placed here)
- Bubo sp. (Late Pleistocene of San Josecito Cavern, Mexico)

Specimen UMMP V31030, a Late Pliocene coracoid from the Rexroad Formation of Kansas (U.S.), cannot be conclusively assigned to either Bubo or Strix. This fossil is from a taxon similar in size to the great horned owl (B. virginianus) or the great grey owl (S. nebulosa).

The Sinclair owl (Bubo sinclairi) from Late Pleistocene California may have been a paleosubspecies of the great horned owl, while the roughly contemporary Bubo insularis of the central and eastern Mediterranean has been considered a junior synonym of a brown fish owl paleosubspecies. Additional paleosubspecies are discussed on the appropriate species page.

Several presumed Bubo fossils have turned out to be from different birds. The Late Eocene/Early Oligocene eared owls "Bubo" incertus and "Bubo" arvernensis are now placed in the fossil barn owl genera Nocturnavis and Necrobyas, respectively. "Bubo" leptosteus is now recognized as primitive owl in the genus Minerva (formerly Protostrix). "Bubo" poirreiri from the Late Oligocene or Early Miocene of Saint-Gérard-le-Puy in France, is now placed in Mioglaux.

On the other hand, the supposed fossil heron "Ardea" lignitum from the Late Pliocene of Plaue-Rippersroda (Germany) was apparently an owl and close to Bubo or more probably actually belongs here. Given its age – about 2 million years ago or so – it is usually included in the Eurasian eagle-owl today.

== Interactions with humans ==
Because of their nocturnal habits, most owls do not directly interact with humans. However, in 2015, an eagle owl in Purmerend, Netherlands, attacked some 50 people before it was caught by a hired falconer.
