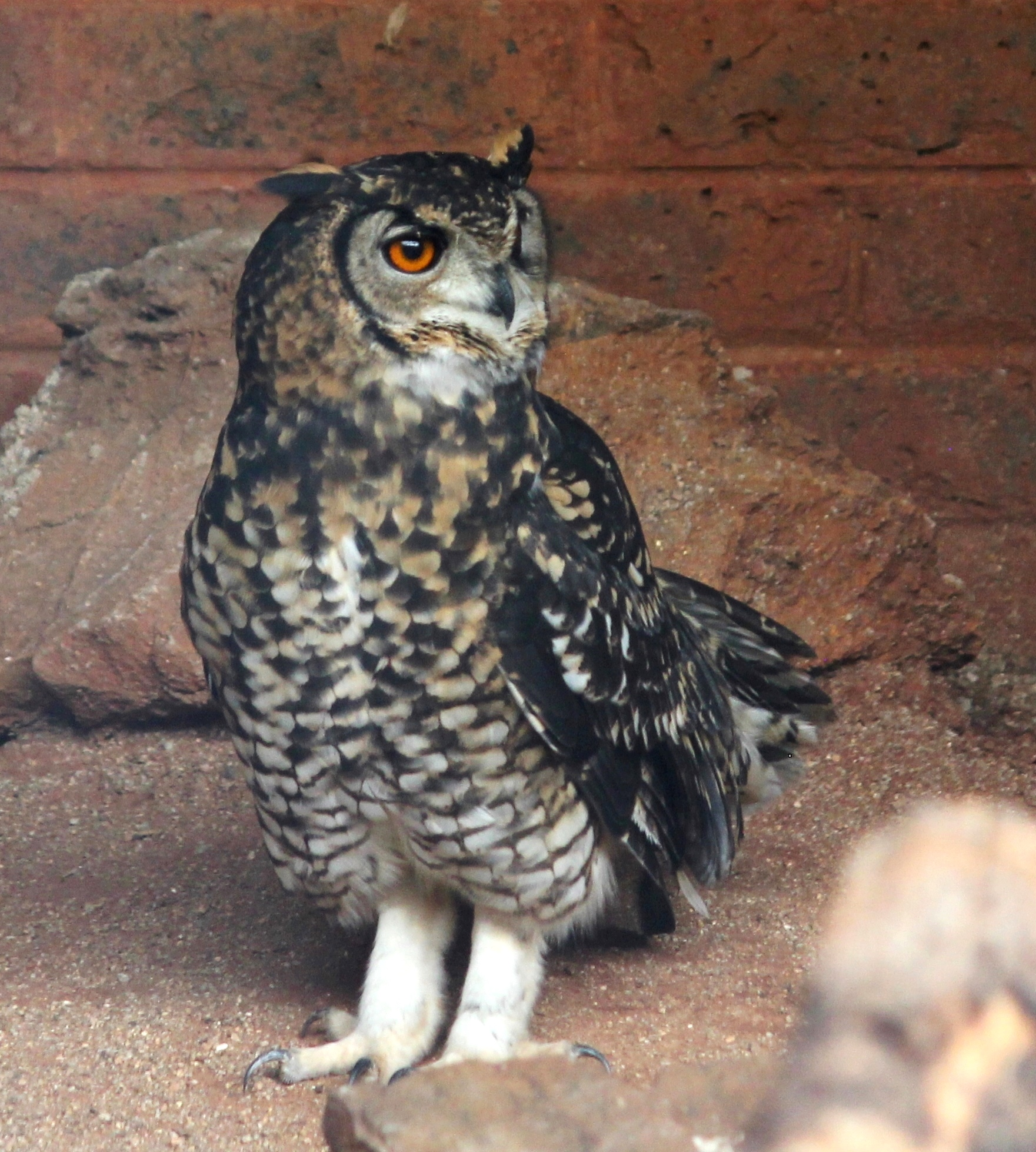
- The nominate subspecies at Pretoria Zoo

Conservation status
- Least Concern (IUCN 3.1)
- CITES Appendix II

Scientific classification
- Kingdom: Animalia
- Phylum: Chordata
- Class: Aves
- Order: Strigiformes
- Family: Strigidae
- Genus: Bubo
- Species: B. capensis

Binomial name
- Bubo capensis Smith, 1834

= Cape eagle-owl =

Species of owl

The Cape eagle-owl (Bubo capensis) is a species of owl in the family Strigidae. It is one of several large species of the eagle-owl genus Bubo.

== Range ==
Its range is limited to the southernmost regions of southern Africa as well as parts of East Africa. Claims that this species is found in the southern Arabian Peninsula are erroneous and presumably due to confusion with Bubo milesi.

== Habitat ==
The Cape eagle-owl is primarily found in mountainous regions or hilly areas with rocks where they find areas to roost, but can also be found in adjacent woodlands, grasslands, and wooded gullies. They are found from sea level up to 2,500 meters above sea level. These owls may also wander into human settlements or even towns, often specifically to prey on pigeons.

== Description ==
This is a large owl, though intermediate in size among other large Bubo owls. Its total length ranges from 46 to 61 cm (18 to 24 in). Males weigh from 905 to 1,387 g (32 to 49 oz) while the larger females range from 1,240 to 1,800 g (44 to 63 oz). The wing chord measures 34.3–41.8 cm (13.5–16.5 in) while the tail measures 15.5–26.6 cm (6.1–10.5 in). This owl is dark brown above with prominent ear-tufts and yellow or yellowish-orange eyes. It is dark below with the sides of the breast being blotchy brown and the paler chest overlaid with white, black and tawny-fulvous markings, variously. The facial disc is fulvous-brown, with a distinct black or dark brown frame that becomes broader towards the neck. Both the tail and wing feathers are barred with light and dark brown. The toes and tarsi are densely feathered, with the little visible skin being brown above and yellowish below the feet.

The song of the male Cape eagle-owl consists of a powerful, explosive hoot, followed by a faint note: boowh-hu. The female's voice is similar but slightly higher pitched. Pairs on occasion will duet. When approaching a female during courtship, the male will let out a trisyllabic cu-coo-cu while bowing to his mate. Both females and young give a nasal, drawn-out chrrreeh while begging for food at the nest. Females cluck slightly while offering food to their young. When alarmed, both sexes let out a barking wack wack wack....

== Subspecies ==
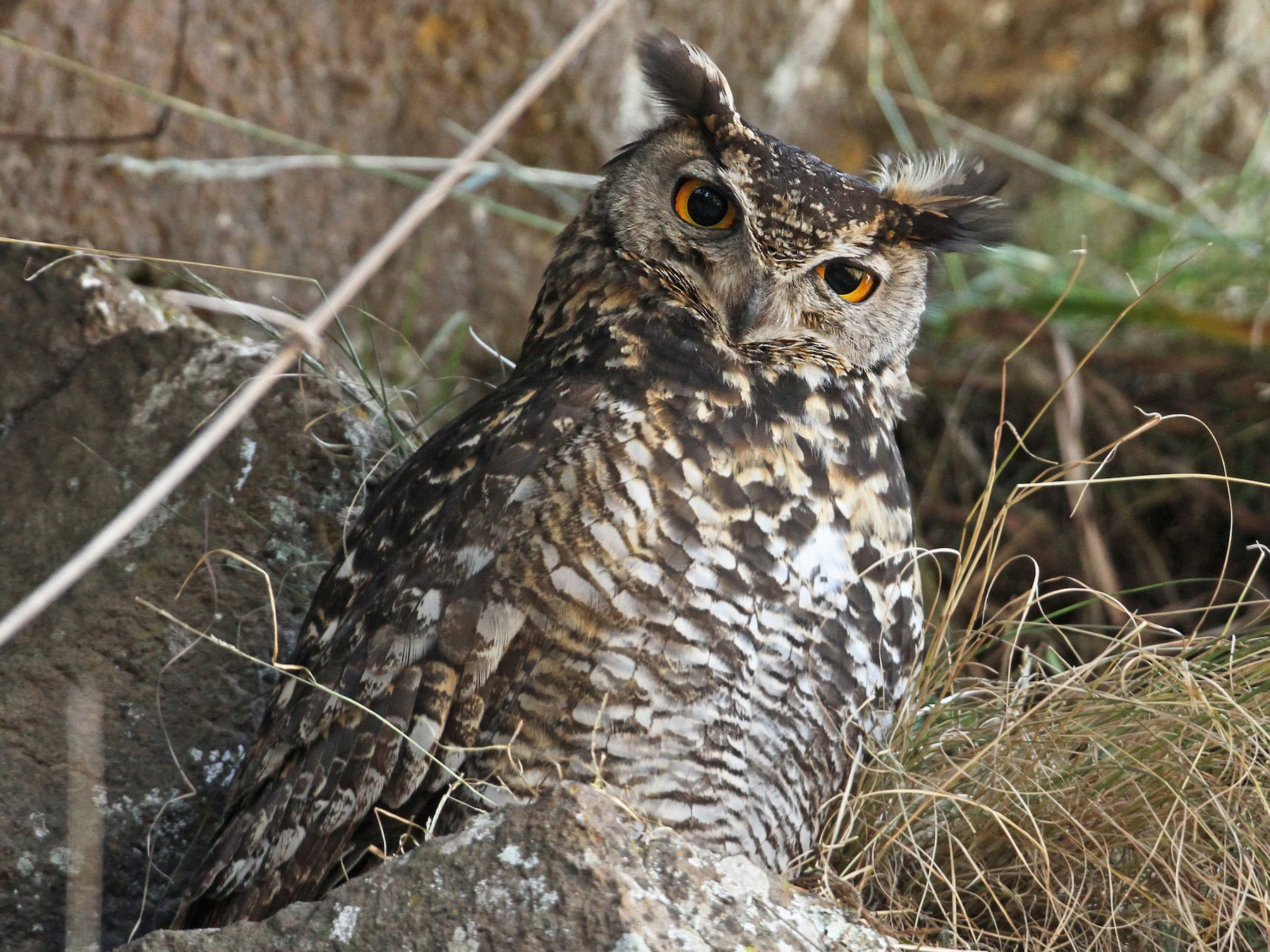
B. c. mackinderi

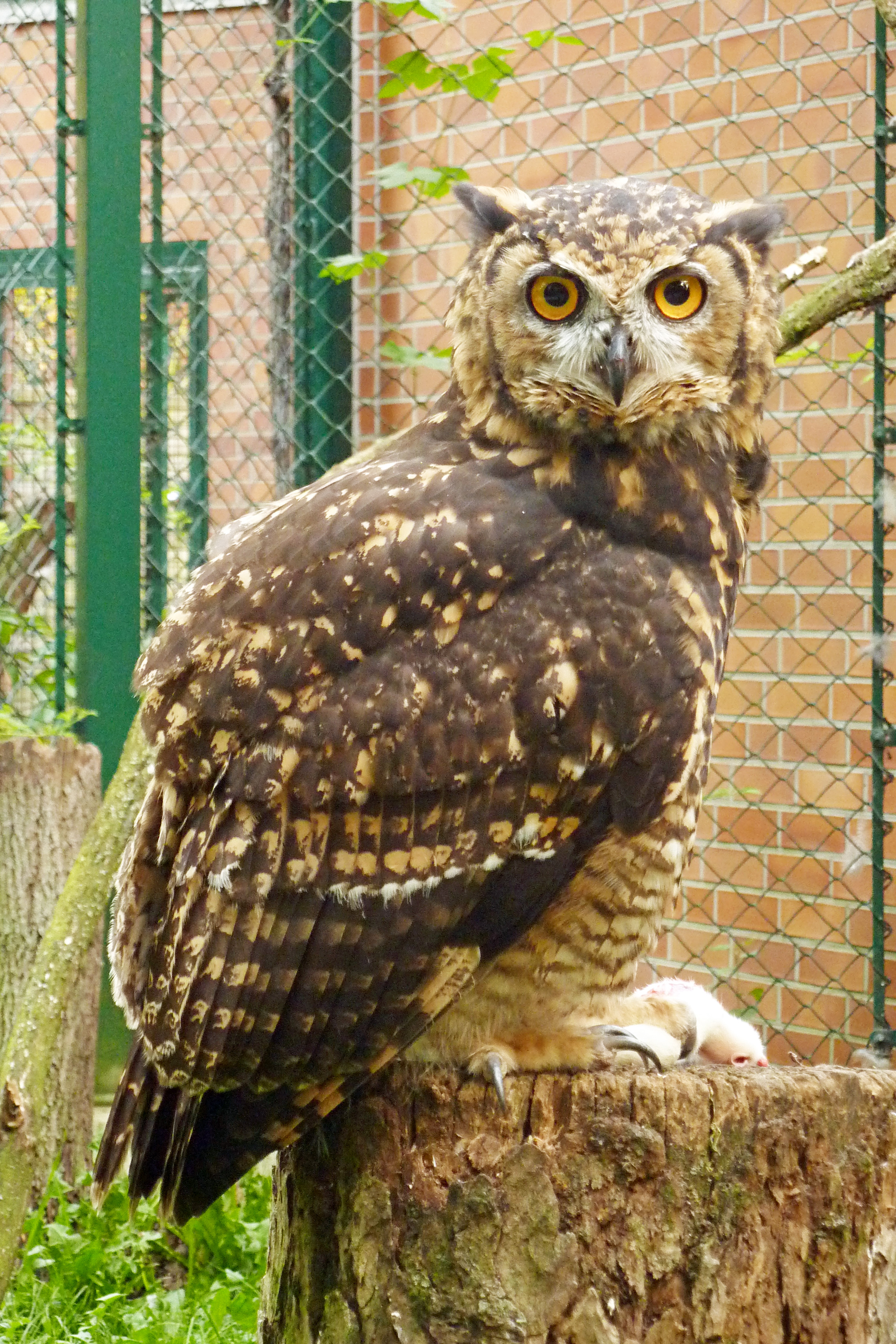
B. c. mackinderi at Tierpark Berlin

There are three subspecies: the Cape eagle-owl (B. c. capensis) (the southern half of Southern Africa), Mackinder's eagle-owl (B. c. mackinderi) (southern Kenya south to the northern half of Southern Africa), and the Abyssinian eagle-owl (B. c. dilloni) (southern Eritrea and the Ethiopian highlands). The nominate subspecies is the smallest-bodied. The subspecies B. c. dilloni is generally richer brown in colour, less coarsely marked below and has more distinct barring on the sides and the breast than the nominate. The biggest-bodied subspecies, B. c. mackinderi, which is slightly bigger than the others, is sometimes considered a separate species (Bubo mackinderi). The latter subspecies is also a more tawny-brownish colour in plumage.

== Behaviour ==
The Cape eagle-owl is nocturnal, roosting by day among rocks, in sheltered rock ledges, or in large rock crevices and caves. They may also roost in trees or even on the ground amongst dense bushes. They have been rarely found roosting in cities like Johannesburg and Pretoria. Often a male and female can be found roosting together, especially just before the breeding season.

The predominant prey for the species is mammals. These can range in size from shrews and small rodents to animals the size of hyraxes which are heavier than the birds themselves. Other important prey can include other birds, up to the size of francolins and hamerkops. Opportunistically, the Cape eagle-owl will supplement its diet with reptiles, frogs, scorpions, crabs and large insects. Mole rats are locally often a favorite prey item and 1 to 3 mole rats can be taken each night during the breeding season. A pair with half-grown chicks requires about 600–750 g (1.32–1.65 lb) per night. Hunts are from prominent perches, with the owl gliding in descending flight after prey and killing them with their powerful talons or bill.

These territorial owls may exist in close proximity where populations are dense, occurring at 2.5 km^{2} (2,500,000 m^{2}). The male advertises the territory by calling, with duets being rare in this species. During courtship, the male bows and hoots in front of the upright, silent female. The nest may be a shallow scrape on a sheltered rock ledge, in a rock crevice, in a cave or even on the ground underneath a dense bush. More rarely, large stick nests made by other birds or the tops of large bushes are used. Normally the Cape eagle-owl breeds every year, but may breed in alternate years. Usually 2 (rare 1 or 3) white eggs are laid, measuring 5.2–5.7 cm (2.0–2.2 in) x 4.3–4.8 cm (1.7–1.9 in) and weighing 62 g (2.2 oz), at 2-day intervals. The female incubates for 34 to 38 days, while the male feeds her. The young hatch at intervals of up to 4 days. New hatchlings weigh 42–51 g (1.5–1.8 oz), then weigh 500 g (18 oz) at 20 days and are nearly adult size by 40 days. The female broods the chicks, feeding them with small piece of meat brought by the males. At 11–13 days old, the chicks sprout buff down from the mesoptile plumage. Although at times of plenty, all chicks may survive, usually the second, smaller chick dies from starvation. By 17 days, the female occasionally leaves the nest but still roosts near the young. By 3 to 4 weeks, the mother stops coming to the nest but still roosts with the young. If the nesting site permits, the young start walking away from the nest at around 45 days old and can fly well by 70–77 days. The young are cared for a total of 6 months and reach sexual maturity the following year.

== Status ==
The Cape eagle-owl is classified as being of least concern by the IUCN, since its range is fairly large and populations appear to be stable. They are common in areas such as the Mau Plateau in Kenya, though they are locally rare to absent in other parts of their range. Around 50–60% of breeding attempts are successful. Predation of nests (especially ground nests) is common as are roadkills and casualties due to power-wires and barbed wire. The use of pesticides to kill rodents may ultimately affect the species.

== Other sources ==
- Owls of the World by Konig, Weick & Becking. Yale University Press (2009), ISBN 0300142277
