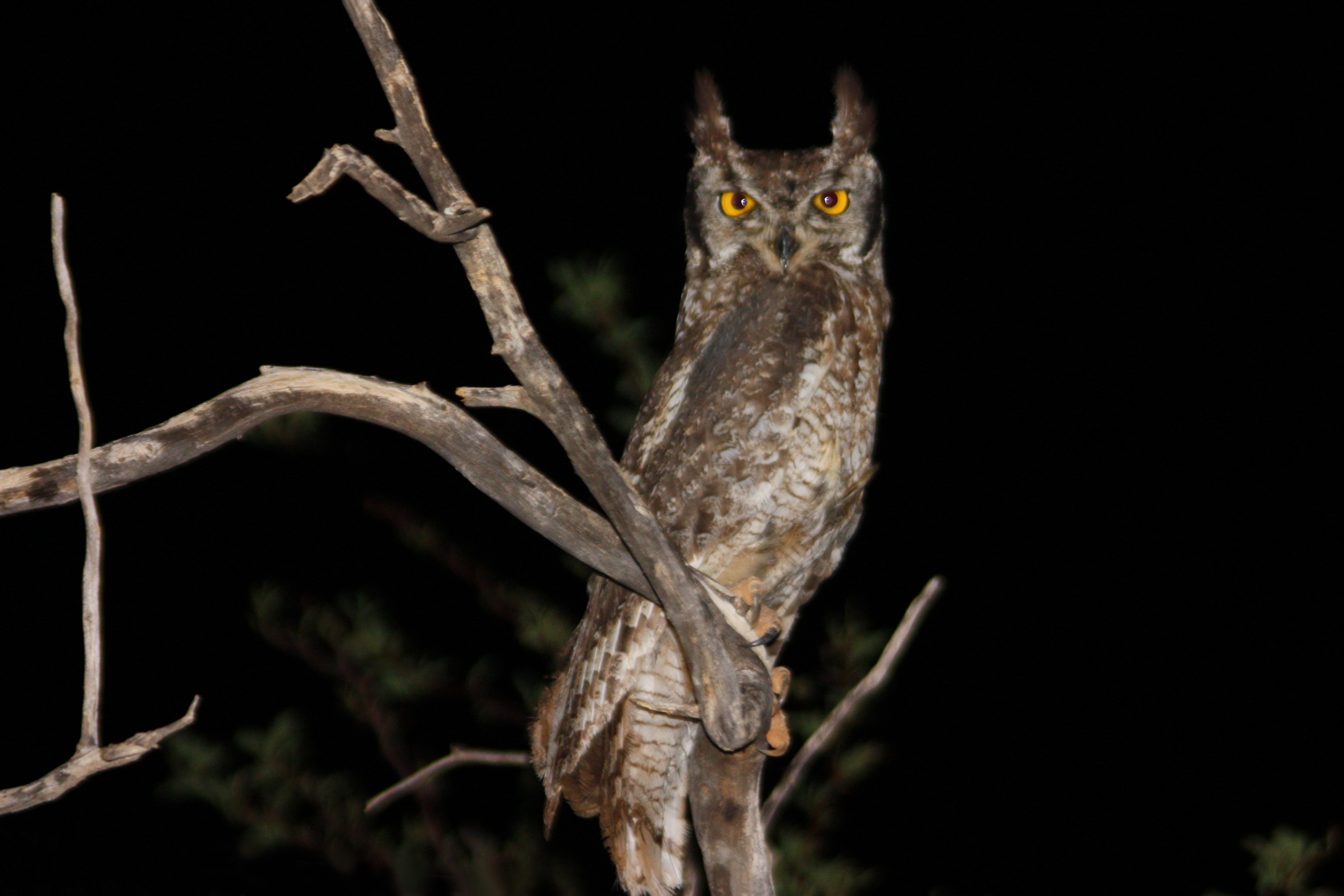
- "Tall-thin position", Tswalu Kalahari Reserve, South Africa

Conservation status
- Least Concern (IUCN 3.1)
- CITES Appendix II

Scientific classification
- Kingdom: Animalia
- Phylum: Chordata
- Class: Aves
- Order: Strigiformes
- Family: Strigidae
- Genus: Bubo
- Species: B. africanus

Binomial name
- Bubo africanus (Temminck, 1821)

= Spotted eagle-owl =

Species of owl

The spotted eagle-owl (Bubo africanus), also known as the African spotted eagle-owl and the African eagle-owl, is a medium-sized species of owl, one of the smallest of the eagle owls. Its length is 45 cm (18 in) and its weight is from 454 to 907 grams (1.0 to 2.0 lb). It has a 100 to 140 cm (39 to 55 in) wingspan. The facial disk is off-white to pale ochre and the eyes are yellow. It has prominent ear-tufts, and the upper body is dusky brown, the lower parts off-white with brown bars. Prior to 1999 the spotted eagle-owl was considered conspecific with the greyish eagle-owl, but now it is classed as a separate species.

== Distribution ==
Spotted eagle-owls are the most common species of owl found in Southern Africa. They have a healthy population in most parts of the region. They are often referred to as urban owls and will live in close proximity to human habitation. They occur throughout Sub-Saharan Africa and the Arabian Peninsula. They can also be found in thorn savanna and in suburban gardens, such as the outskirts of Harare, Zimbabwe.

== Diet ==
Its prey mainly consists of rodents, small mammals, birds (up to the size of terns and falcons), insects (such as beetles), other arthropods (such as termites, spiders and scorpions), reptiles, frogs and carrion, although it has a dietary preference for small mammals such as rodents, shrews, bats, hedgehogs and young hares. It often swallows its prey whole, with much head-jerking, pausing and resting in between, while a portion of the prey remains inside the mouth, until the prey can finally be swallowed down completely. Undigested substances such as feathers and bone are regurgitated within the next 24 hours of ingestion in the form of a pellet. For prey too large to swallow whole, the owl will tear pieces of meat from the prey, and will also tear shreds to feed nestlings. The male will hunt and bring food when the female cannot leave the nest. Sometimes, even in conditions verging on starvation, he will tear the head off a mouse, but bring the body for the female to feed to the young, or to eat herself if the eggs have not yet hatched. The species is a more generalist feeder, in contrast to say, the barn owls (Tyto) and is accordingly itinerant, remaining in a given region to hunt for a few weeks or months, then moving on when the local prey is no longer plentiful or easy to catch. Typically it will return at odd intervals of a year or two, depending on local conditions. An adult pair is typically very aggressive in defence of its hunting territory, and one obstacle for an adolescent to overcome is to find good feeding grounds where there are no incumbent adults to eject or kill it.

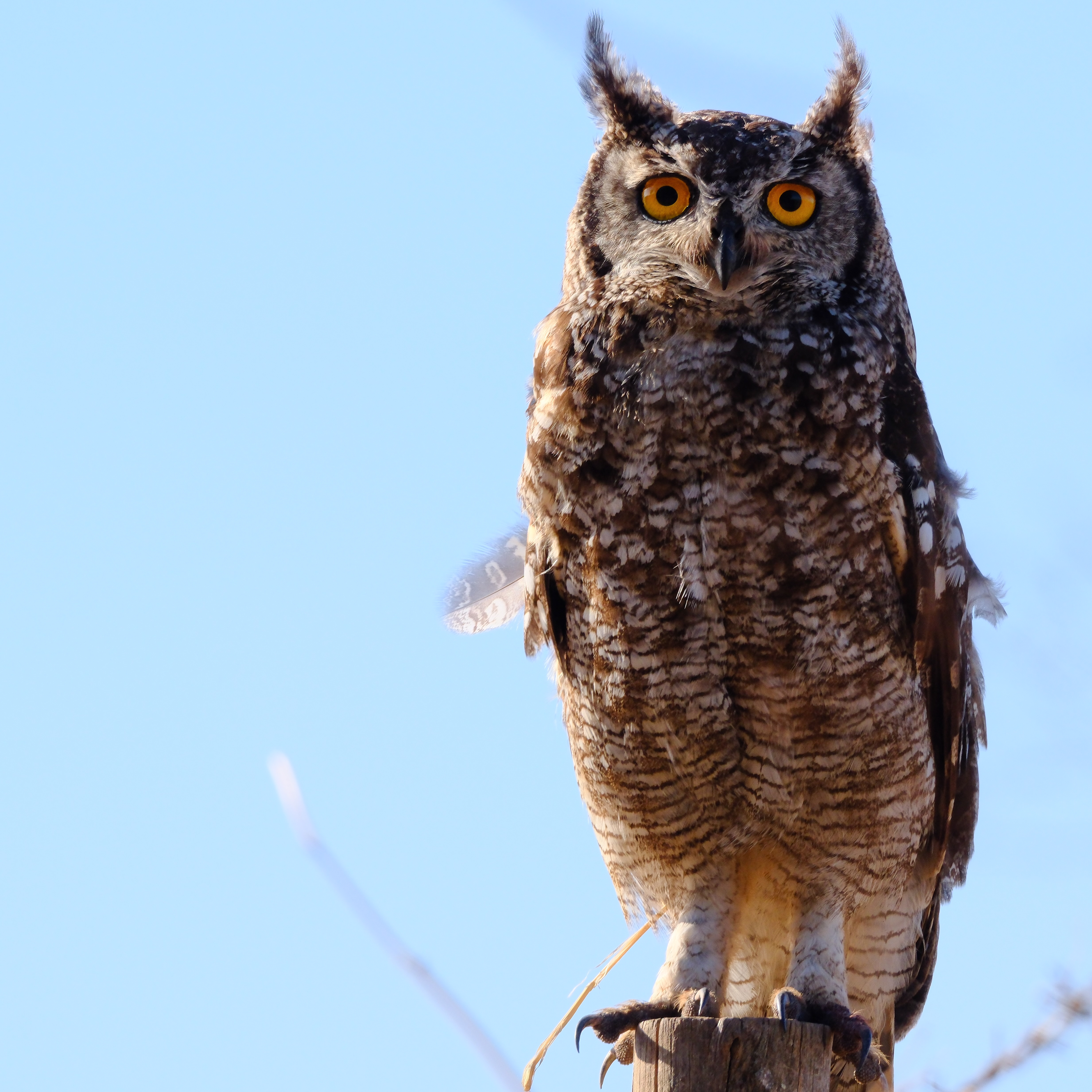
Spotted eagle-owl (adult), perched, Swartland, South Africa

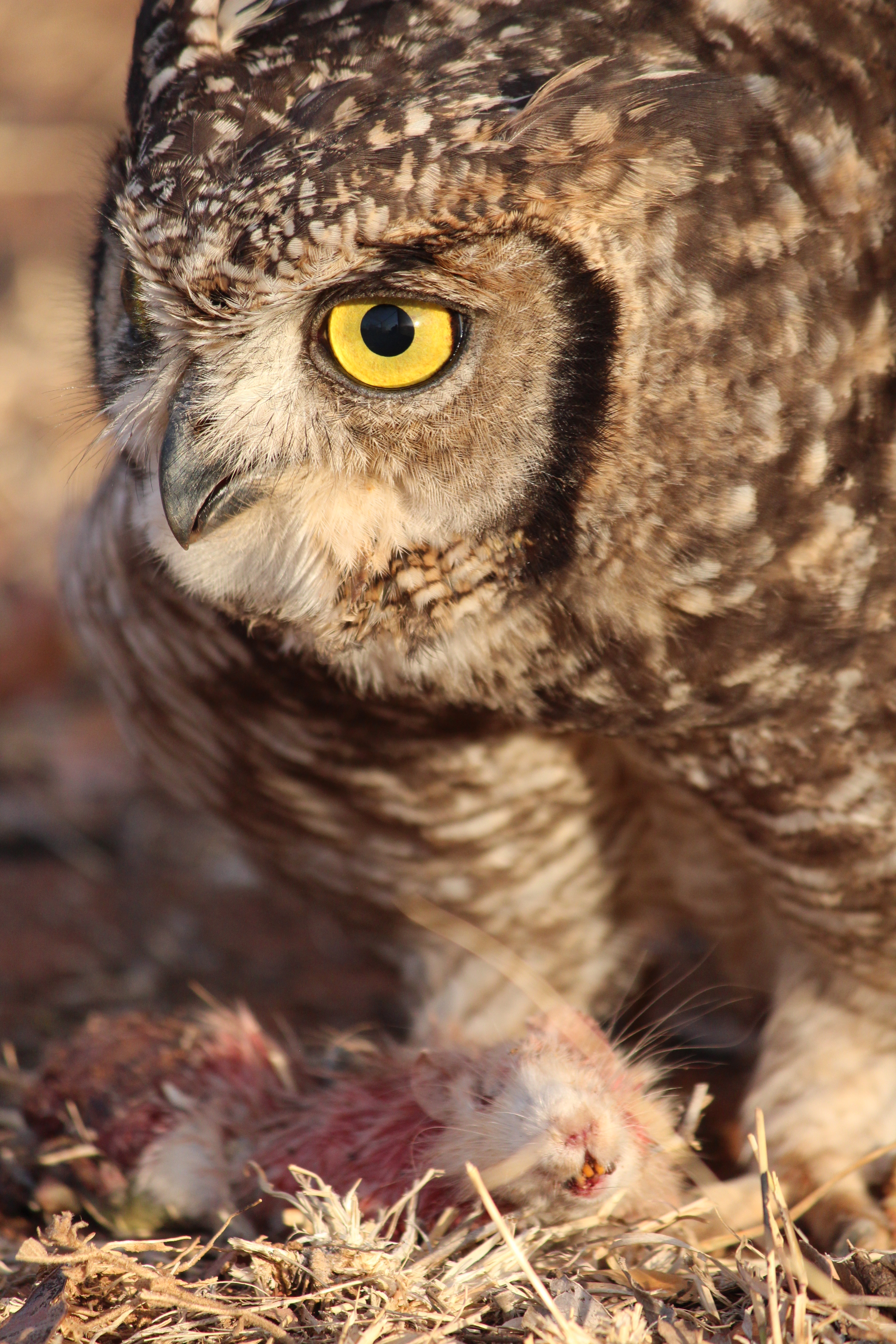
A spotted eagle-owl feeding on a rat

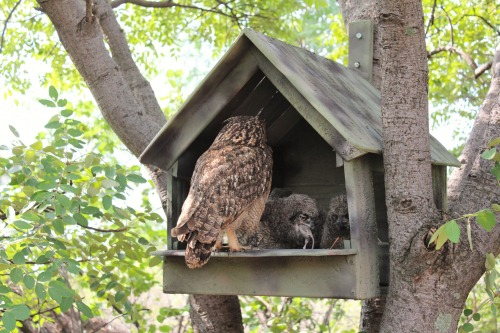
A spotted eagle-owl is feeding young owlets inside an owl house made from recycled plastic. Photographed at the Owl Rescue Centre in the North West Province of South Africa.

== Behaviour ==
The calls are generally typical, musical eagle-owl hoots. Generally the male call with two hoots: "Hooo hooopoooo" and the female answers with three, with less stress on the middle note: "Hooo hoo hooo". The young do not hoot till effectively adult, but from a very young age they will hiss threateningly and snap their beaks castanet-like if alarmed. These sounds they make throughout life, generally in a threatening attitude with head down and wings spread sideways to present their upper surfaces forward, umbrella-like. They might present such behaviour either as a challenge to rival owls or when defending nest or young against enemies. The young at least have a whickering call of protest or annoyance when handled. In a comfortable social situation the youngsters have a soft croaking "kreeep" that they are prone to repeat at regular intervals of a few seconds. If they suspect that they have lost their company, the calls increase in frequency and they are likely to go hunting for their companions. Chicks and adults will snap bills, hiss and chitter to threaten or distract.

As with all owls this species, when detected, is subject to daylight harassment by local birds. In the Gauteng area its main and extremely loud tormentor is the grey loerie, respite only coming at dusk. Spotted eagle-owls are regular bathers and during summer thunderstorms may be seen on tree limbs or on the ground with spread wings.

They prefer rocky areas, favouring to roost in open areas such as on the ground, rocky outcrops and tree crowns.

== Reproduction ==
Spotted eagle-owls are monogamous, but will take a new mate shortly after the loss of a partner through death occurs. They are able to breed at around one year of age. They usually make their nest on the ground but have been known to nest on man-made structures such as window ledges of buildings or in Owl Houses, preferring large cavities. Breeding begins typically towards the end of July continuing to the first weeks of February. The female lays two to four eggs and does the incubation, leaving the nest only to eat what the male has brought for food. The incubation period lasts approximately 32 days. Spotted eagle-owlets will jump out of a nest that is off the ground at about five weeks of age and spend about ten days on the ground before they can fly. During this time, the owlets learn essential skills by mock-hunting and catching smaller prey such as insects. The parents still support feed the young owls during this stage by bringing larger prey such as rodents for the owlets to feed on. Owlets make a rasping noise when they are hungry that can be heard by the parents over far distances to alert them to the owlets location. Owlets are usually wrongfully removed from their parents during this phase by unknowing individuals who assume that the owlet is either injured or abandoned due to its inability to fly. The young owls can fly at around seven weeks of age, but continue to stay with the parents for several weeks after they have fledged. They have a life span of up to 10 years in the wild and up to 20 in captivity.

== Conservation ==
They are not globally threatened, and are often the most common owl species in their habitats.

It is illegal to capture or keep any indigenous owls in South Africa without the necessary rehabilitation permit issued by the Department of Nature Conservation. Specialized care is required in captivity consisting of a balanced diet with the correct ratio of calcium to phosphorus and specific husbandry needs that should be met. If raised on the incorrect diet, owlets suffer malnutrition of various types, including metabolic bone disorder (MBD) which causes poor bone formation and could lead to their death. Specialized release methods are applied to integrate captive-raised owlets back into the wild.

Car collisions, electric wires, persecution, secondary poisoning and parasite infections such as Trichomonas gallinae are the major causes of mortality. Juveniles and newly fledged birds are particularly vulnerable.

== Gallery ==
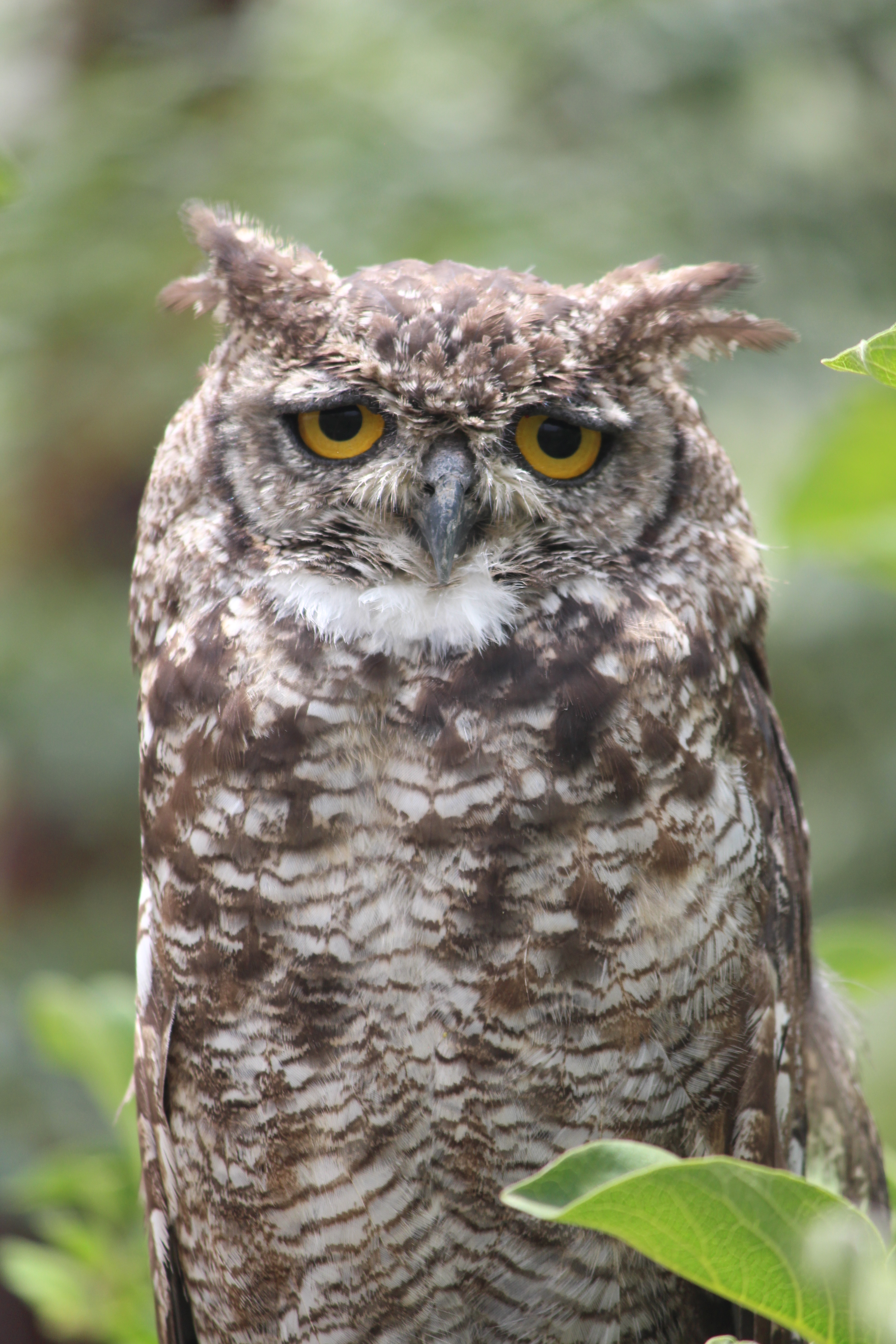
Roosting spotted eagle-owl

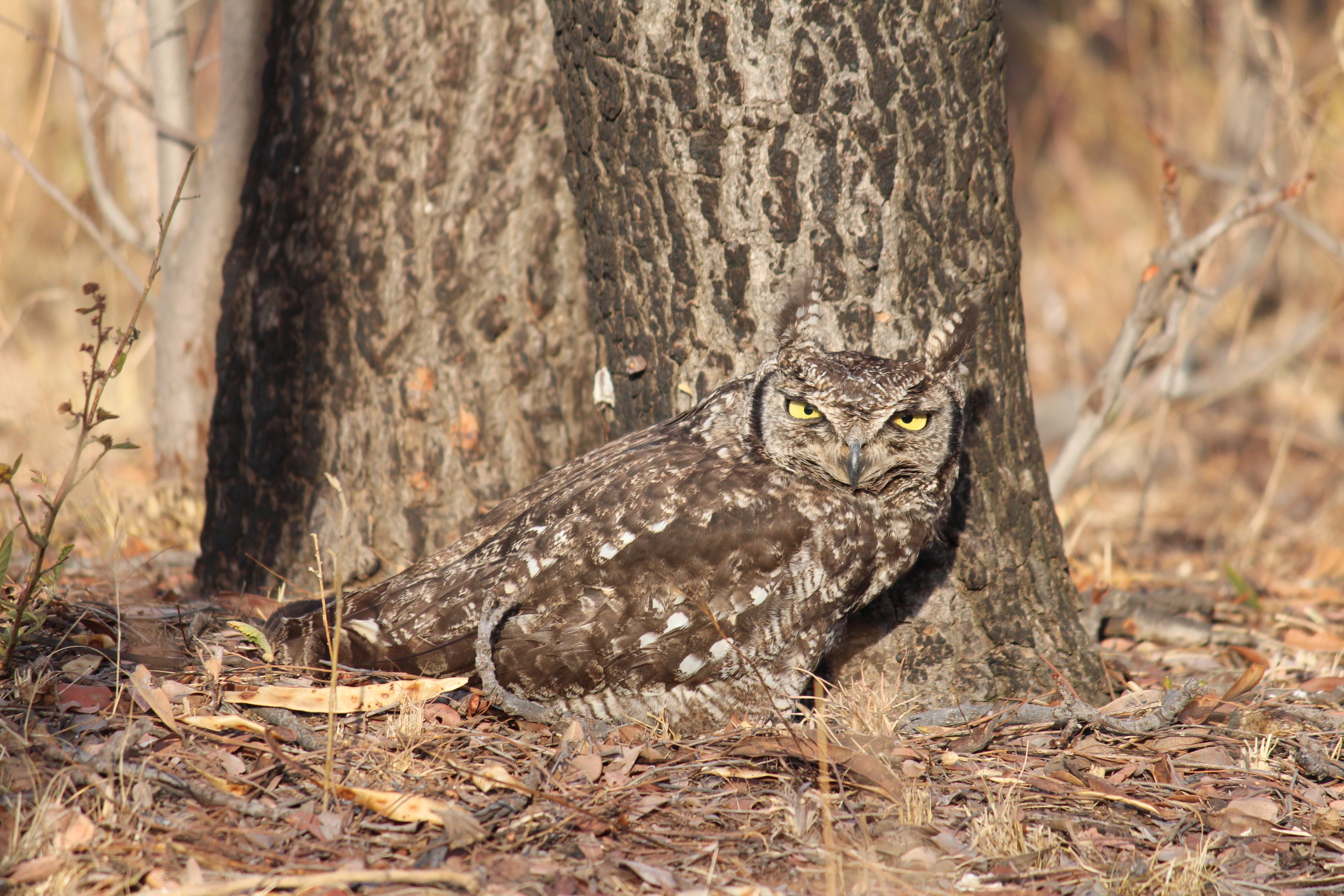
A spotted eagle-owl blends in perfectly with its surroundings. Photographed at the Owl Rescue Centre in the North West Province of South Africa.

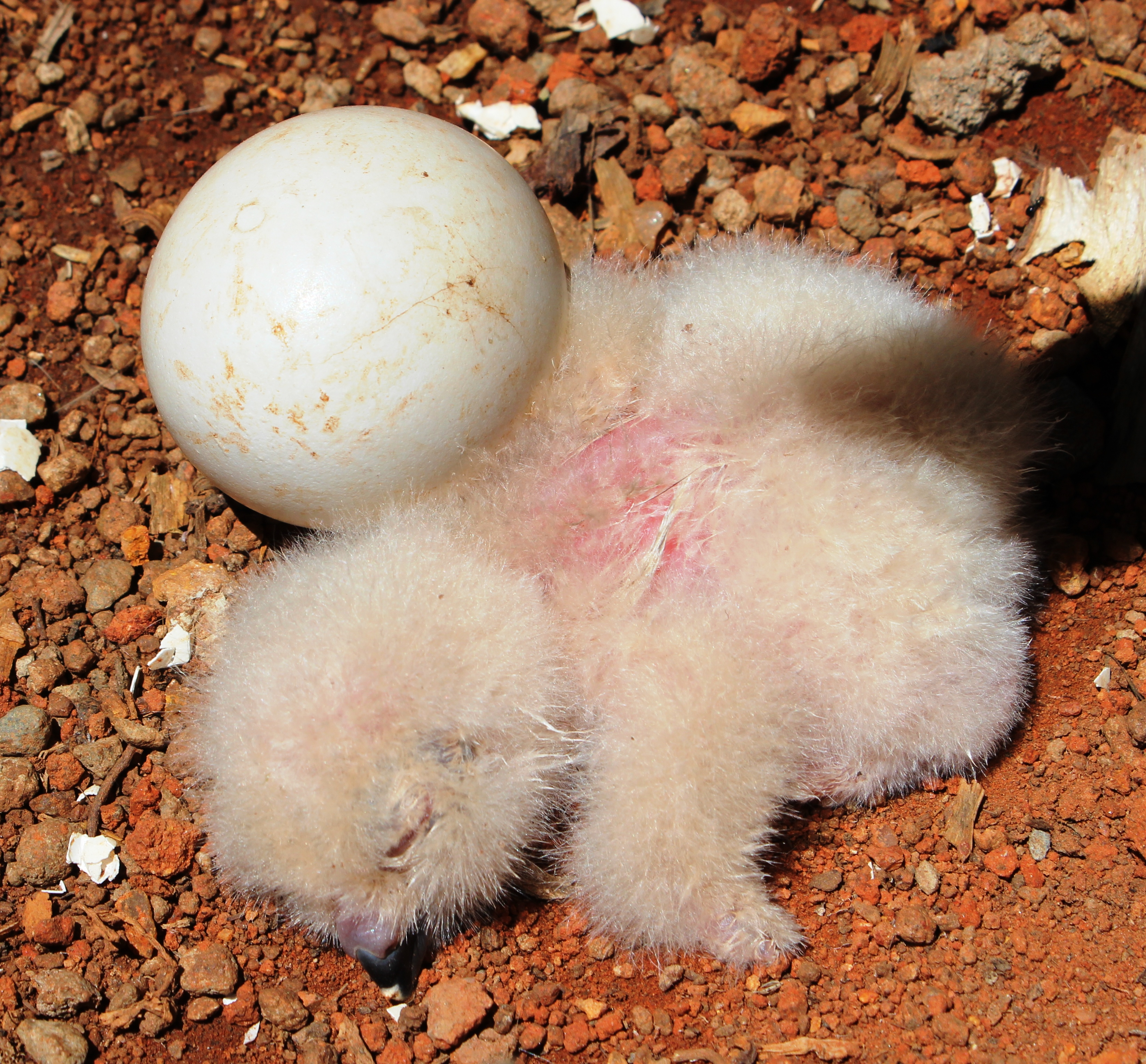
A day-old spotted eagle-owlet in its 'nest' on the ground.

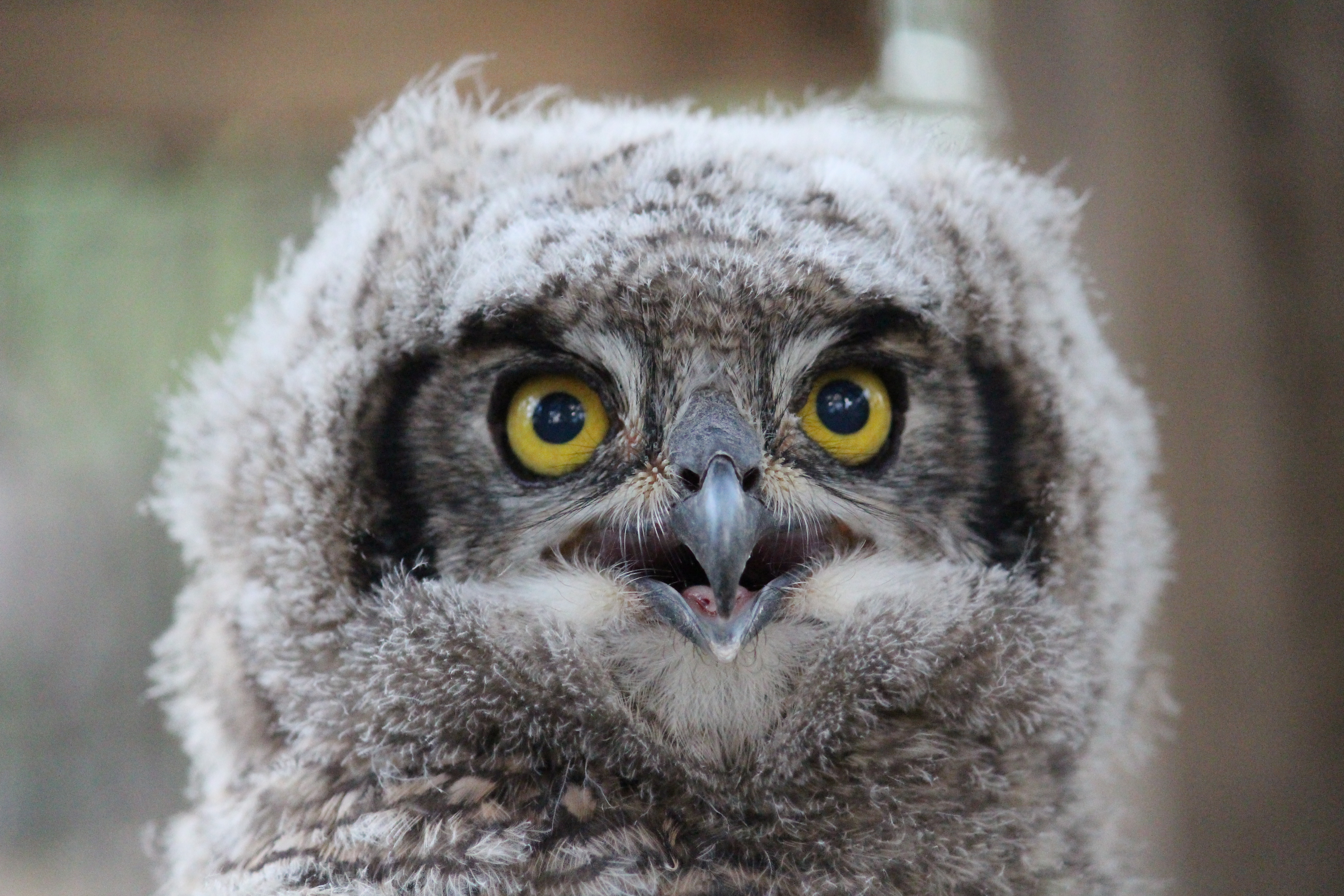
A juvenile spotted eagle-owl will develop its ear-tufts at about six months old.

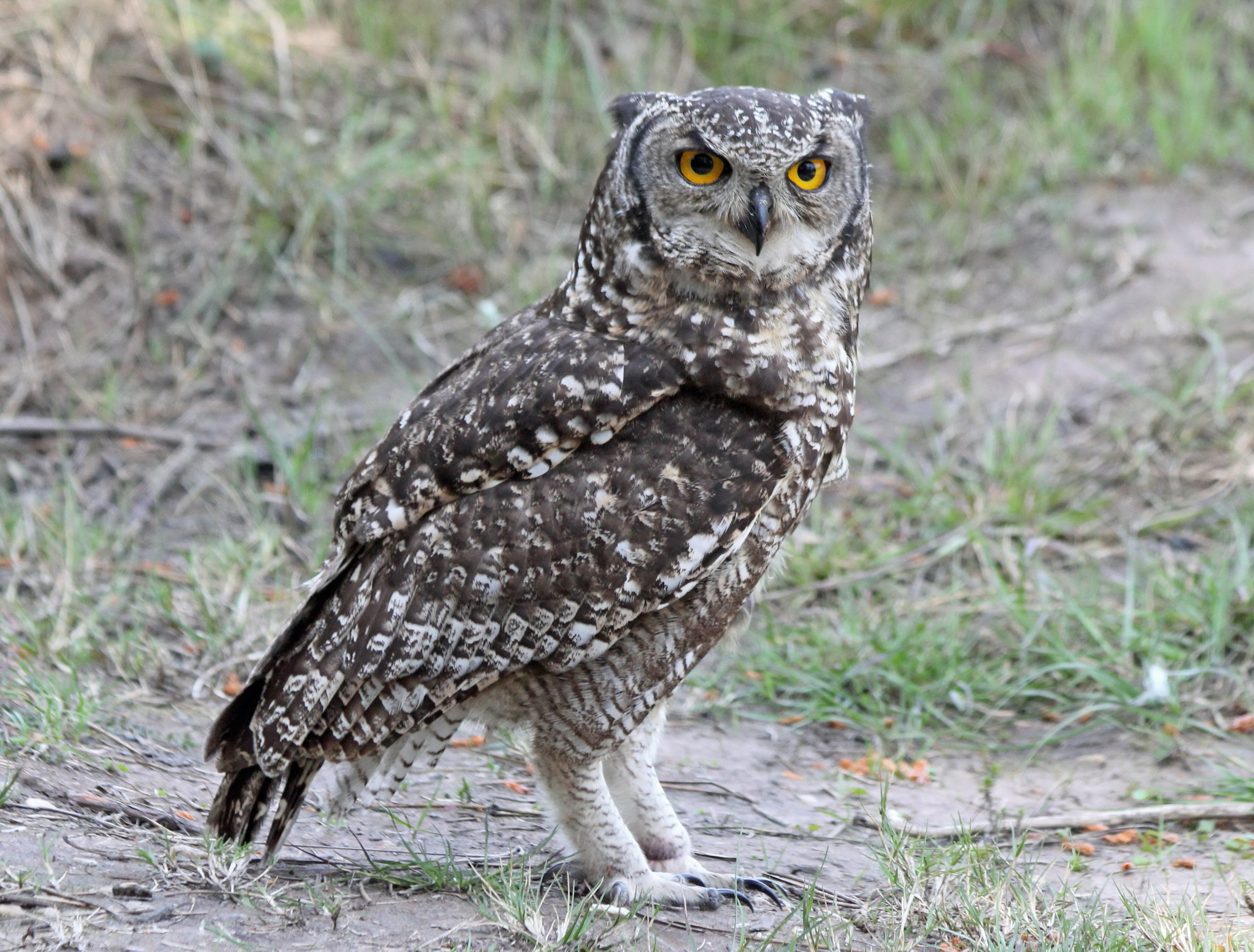
A spotted eagle owl at Eagle Encounters in Stellenbosch

Humans interacting with a spotted eagle-owl in captivity
