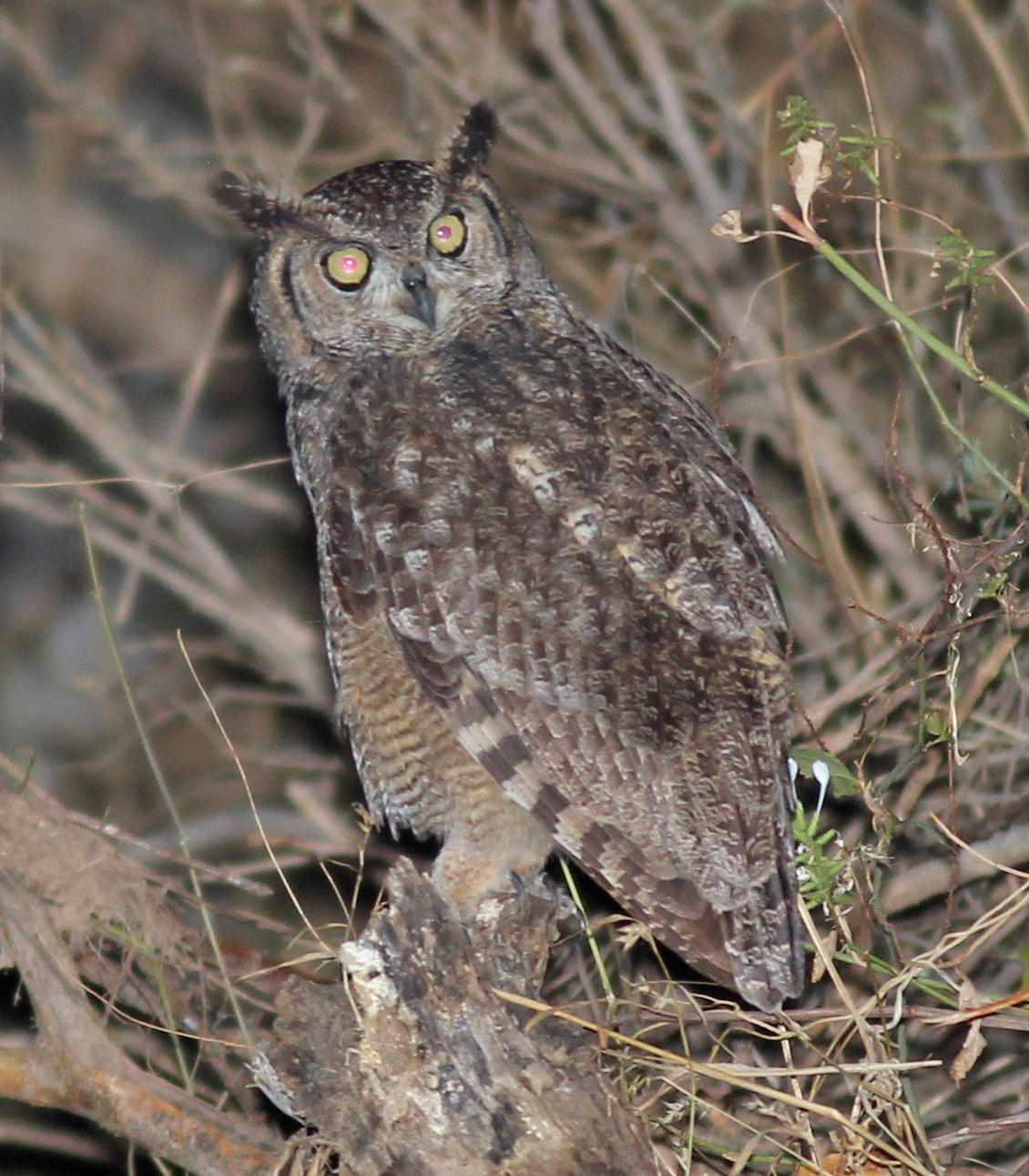

Conservation status
- Least Concern (IUCN 3.1)
- CITES Appendix II

Scientific classification
- Kingdom: Animalia
- Phylum: Chordata
- Class: Aves
- Order: Strigiformes
- Family: Strigidae
- Genus: Bubo
- Species: B. milesi

Binomial name
- Bubo milesi Sharpe, 1886

= Arabian eagle-owl =

Species of bird

The Arabian eagle-owl (Bubo milesi) is a true owl, of the family Strigidae, endemic to areas of the Arabian Peninsula, known from southwestern Saudi Arabia, Yemen, Oman and the United Arab Emirates. Primarily, the species is known from the coastal areas and slightly inland of the peninsula, seemingly avoiding the most barren of the region's desert interior. It nests in wadis, cliffs, on canyon walls, large palms and other trees.

A nocturnal hunter with naturally superb night vision, the Arabian eagle-owl primarily preys on rodents and other small animals. The unique tufts of feathers on its head (vaguely resembling "ears") serve to sharpen the owl's already-keen sense of hearing by directing delicate, nearly-inaudible sound waves toward its ears, enabling it to hear scurrying or digging small animals in the sand, even from a considerable distance. Similarly, the owl's rounded facial feathers, particularly surrounding the eyes—known as facial discs—filter light highly efficiently, especially at nighttime, helping it to focus-in on potential prey.

== Description ==
Bubo milesi is a medium-sized owl, visually very similar to the Eurasian eagle-owl (B. bubo) or the Pharaoh eagle-owl (B. ascalaphus) of North Africa, possessing the same "ear"-tufts on its head for improved hearing. Overall, however, the species is smaller and has a slightly darker plumage, while its eyes are a bright yellow.

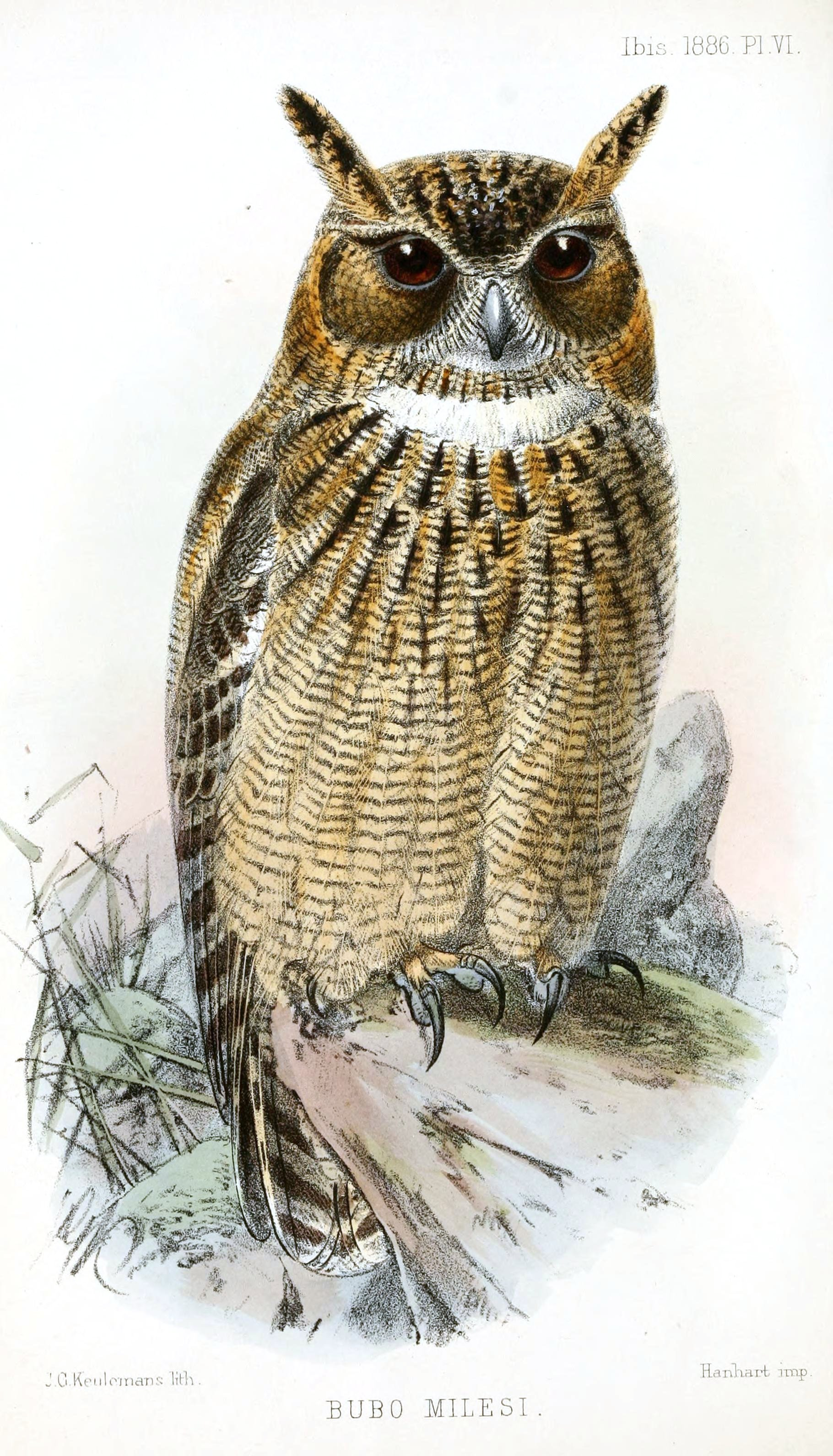
1886 Illustration of species.
