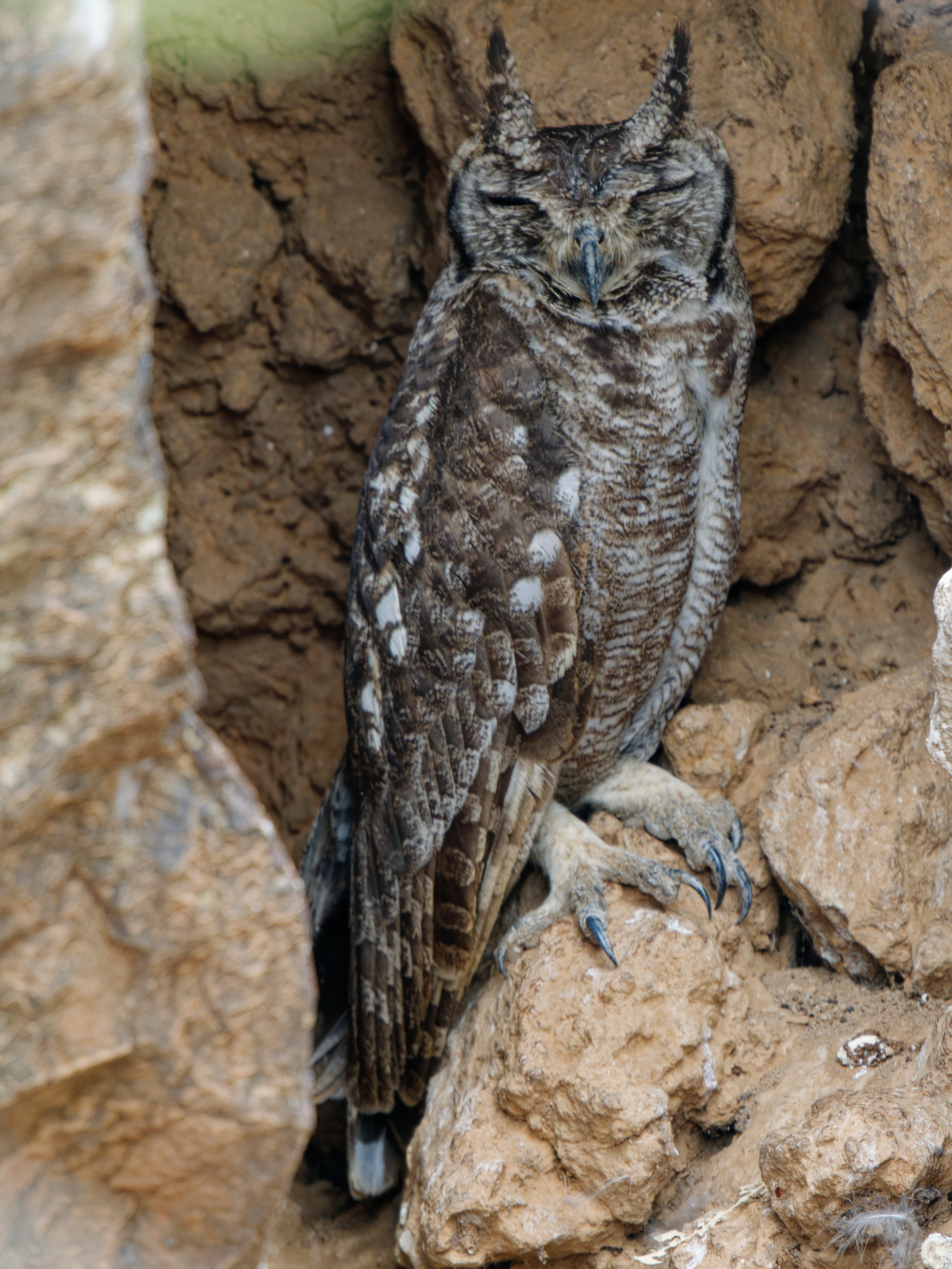
- Greyish eagle-owl in a cave at the Cliffs near Lake Baringo, Kenya

Conservation status
- Least Concern (IUCN 3.1)
- CITES Appendix II

Scientific classification
- Kingdom: Animalia
- Phylum: Chordata
- Class: Aves
- Order: Strigiformes
- Family: Strigidae
- Genus: Bubo
- Species: B. cinerascens

Binomial name
- Bubo cinerascens Guérin-Méneville, 1843

= Greyish eagle-owl =

Species of owl

The greyish eagle-owl or vermiculated eagle-owl (Bubo cinerascens) is a rather large owl of the northern part of sub-Saharan Africa. It was previously regarded as the northern subspecies of the spotted eagle-owl (Bubo africanus).

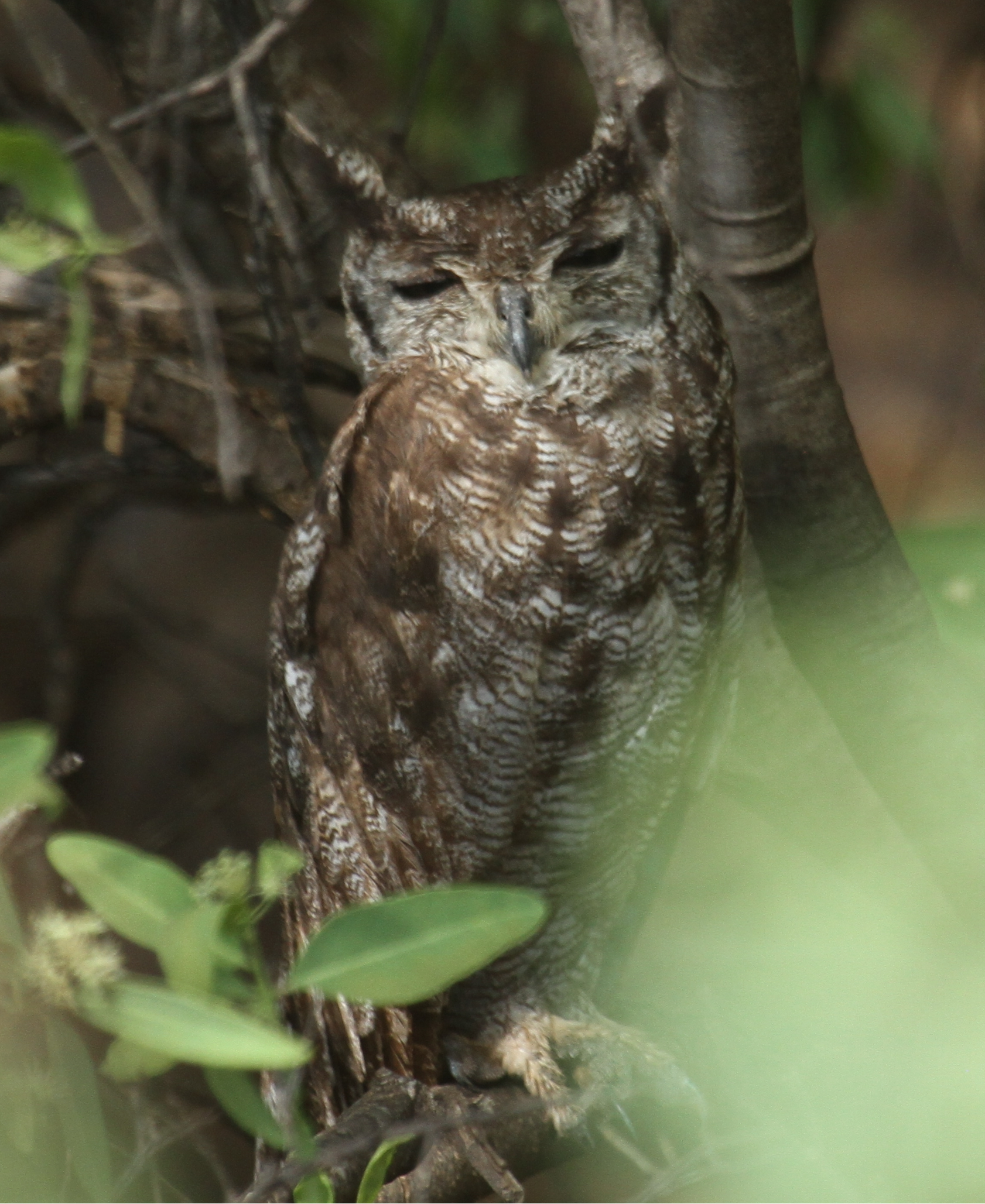
Lake Bogoria, Kenya

== Description ==
This species is about 43 cm (17 in) long and weighs about 500 g (18 oz). Like the spotted eagle-owl, the greyish eagle-owl has mottled dark brown, buff, and white upperparts and finely barred (vermiculated) underparts giving a greyish-brown appearance. It differs from the spotted eagle-owl in having dark brown (not yellow) eyes and a brownish facial disk marked with a heavy brown circle around each eye. It also has morphological differences, such as being lighter though about the same length and having shorter tarsi.

== Voice ==
As the greyish eagle-owl was considered the northern form of the spotted eagle-owl until recently their vocalisations have not been well studied. The call of the male recorded in West Africa consisted of two clear syllables and has been rendered as "koo-whoo" where the "koo" part is rather explosive and the "whoo" is somewhat downward inflected, lower pitched and extended. This call is made every few seconds and is thus not similar to that of the spotted eagle-owl.

== Distribution and habitat ==
It is found in the northern part of sub-Saharan Africa from Mauritania and Liberia east to Sudan and Somalia. Its habitats include dry rocky deserts and open savannah, as well as lowland forests in Somalia.

== Biology ==
Roosts during the day are hidden and vary from rocky natural sites such as cliff crevices and boulders to bushes and trees to man-made structures. It feeds on larger insects and other large arthropods as well as vertebrates. It usually hunts from a perch, using a sit-and-wait technique, but may also hawk insects and sometimes bats in flight. The breeding biology is probably similar to the spotted eagle-owl. It lays 2 or 3 eggs in a scrape on the ground or among rocks or in a sheltered cliff site, although it will sometimes reuse the old platform-like nests of larger birds in trees.

== Taxonomic note ==
It is closely related to the spotted eagle-owl, of which is it sometimes considered the northern subspecies, Bubo africanus cinerascens. In the area of overlap with the spotted eagle-owl in Kenya and the Horn of Africa, the two species are not known to interbreed.
