= Mioglaux =

Mioglaux Temporal range: Early Miocene

Scientific classification
- Kingdom: Animalia
- Phylum: Chordata
- Class: Aves
- Order: Strigiformes
- Family: Strigidae
- Genus: †Mioglaux
- Species: †M. debellatrix

Binomial name
- †Mioglaux debellatrix Mlíkovský, 1998

Extinct genus of owls

Mioglaux is an extinct genus of strigid that lived during the Early Miocene. It contains the single species Mioglaux debellatrix.

== Distribution ==
Mioglaux debellatrix is known from Czechia.
