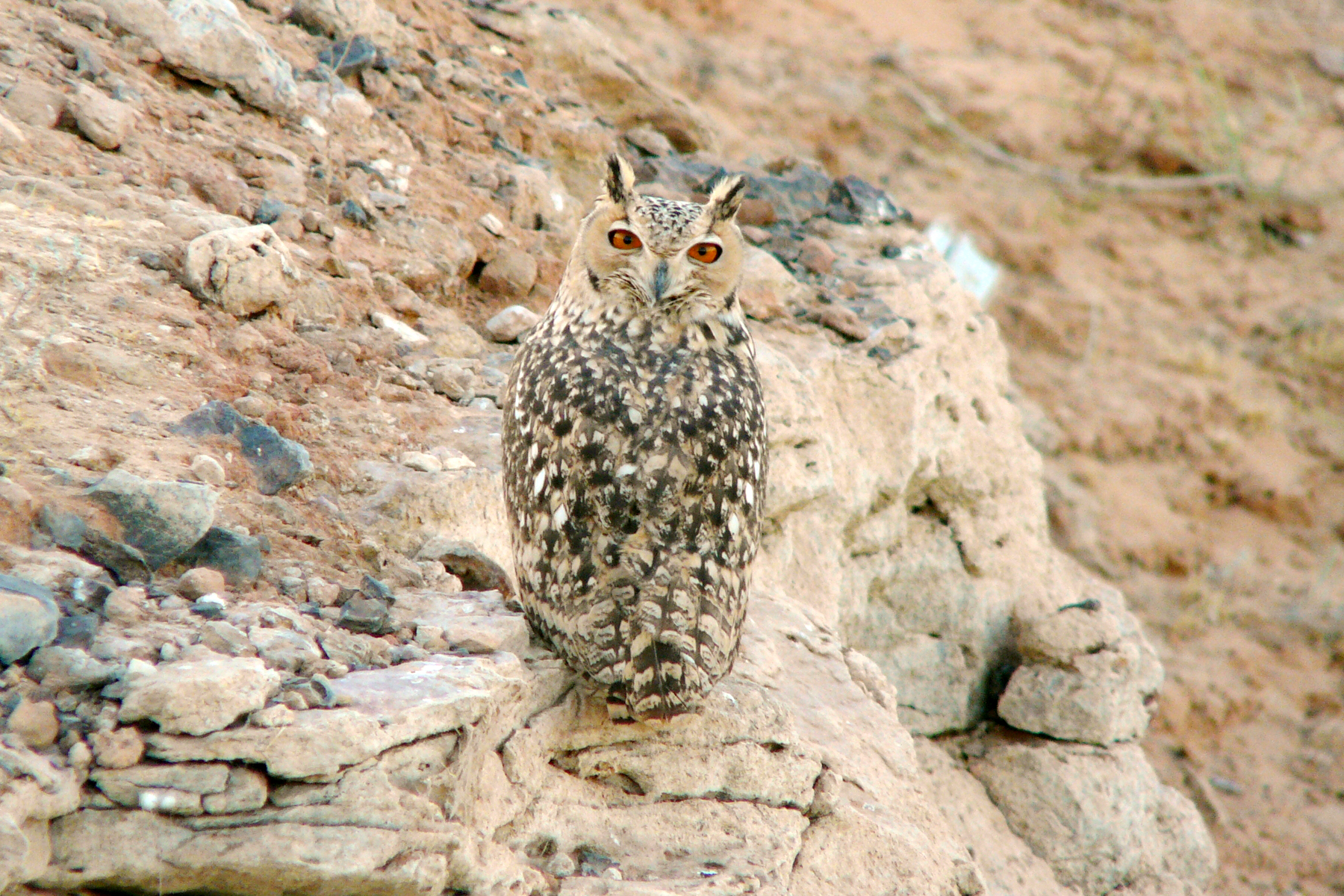
- At Abu Simbel, Egypt

Conservation status
- Least Concern (IUCN 3.1)
- CITES Appendix II

Scientific classification
- Kingdom: Animalia
- Phylum: Chordata
- Class: Aves
- Order: Strigiformes
- Family: Strigidae
- Genus: Bubo
- Species: B. ascalaphus

Binomial name
- Bubo ascalaphus Savigny, 1809
- Range of the Pharaoh eagle-owl

= Pharaoh eagle-owl =

Species of owl

The Pharaoh eagle-owl (Bubo ascalaphus) is a Middle Eastern and North African species of owl in the family Strigidae.

== Description ==
The Pharaoh eagle-owl has a mottled plumage and large orange-yellow eyes. The head and upperparts are tawny and densely marked with black and creamy-white streaks and blotches, while the underparts are pale creamy-white, with black streaks on the upper breast and fine reddish-brown vermiculations on the lower breast and belly. The face has the disc-like form typical of most owls, defined by a dark rim, the robust bill is black and hooked, and the head is crowned with small ear tufts. With a body length of 46–50 cm (18–20 in), it is one of the smaller eagle-owl species. Two subspecies have been named, B. a. ascalaphus and B. a. desertorum, the latter formerly cited as being smaller and paler with sandier colour; they are no longer accepted as distinct, as the variation is continuous and without geographic basis, so the species now regarded as monotypic.

== Distribution and habitat ==
The Pharaoh eagle-owl is native to much of arid Northern Africa, including some of the most desolate parts of the central Saharan Desert, where it may be found in Algeria, Chad, Egypt, Eritrea, Libya, Mali, Mauritania, Morocco, Niger, Senegal (vagrant owls), Sudan and Tunisia. Its range extends eastward into the Arabian Peninsula and the Middle East, where it is found in Iran, Iraq, Israel, Jordan, Kuwait, Oman, Palestine, Qatar, Saudi Arabia, Syria and the United Arab Emirates. Its preferred habitat is mostly open, barren plains or desert with scattered palms or other endemic plants, where it nests in rocky outcrops, wadis and cliffs.

== Behaviour and ecology ==
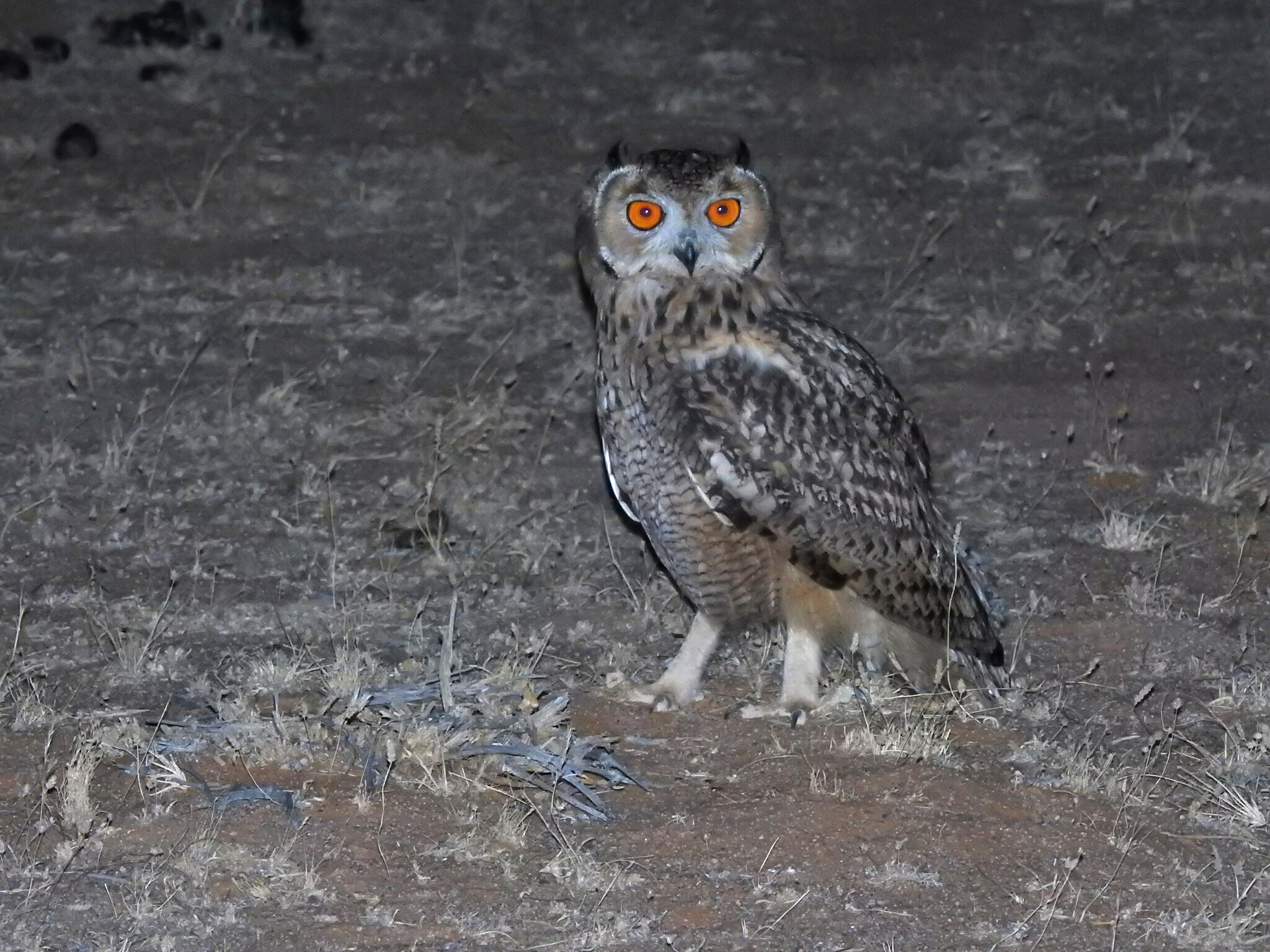
Hunting at night in the desert near Baqaa, Saudi Arabia

The Pharaoh eagle-owl is nocturnal and emerges at dusk to hunt over an area of about 5 km^{2} (1.9 sq mi). It perches on an eminence and watches and listens to detect moving prey before swooping down on its victim. It will feed on any small creatures it can find, but rodents, especially gerbils are favoured prey. Other mammals such as bats, desert foxes, and hares are also taken, as well as small birds, snakes, lizards, beetles, and scorpions. They occasionally prey on other birds of prey such as barn owls, little owls, and common kestrels.

This owl is monogamous and forms a lifelong relationship. Breeding takes place in late winter; the nest is a scrape in a crevice or among rocks. Two eggs are laid and incubated by the female for about 31 days. Both parents feed the chicks and leave the nest at about 20 to 35 days old, but remain reliant on their parents for several more months.

== Conservation ==
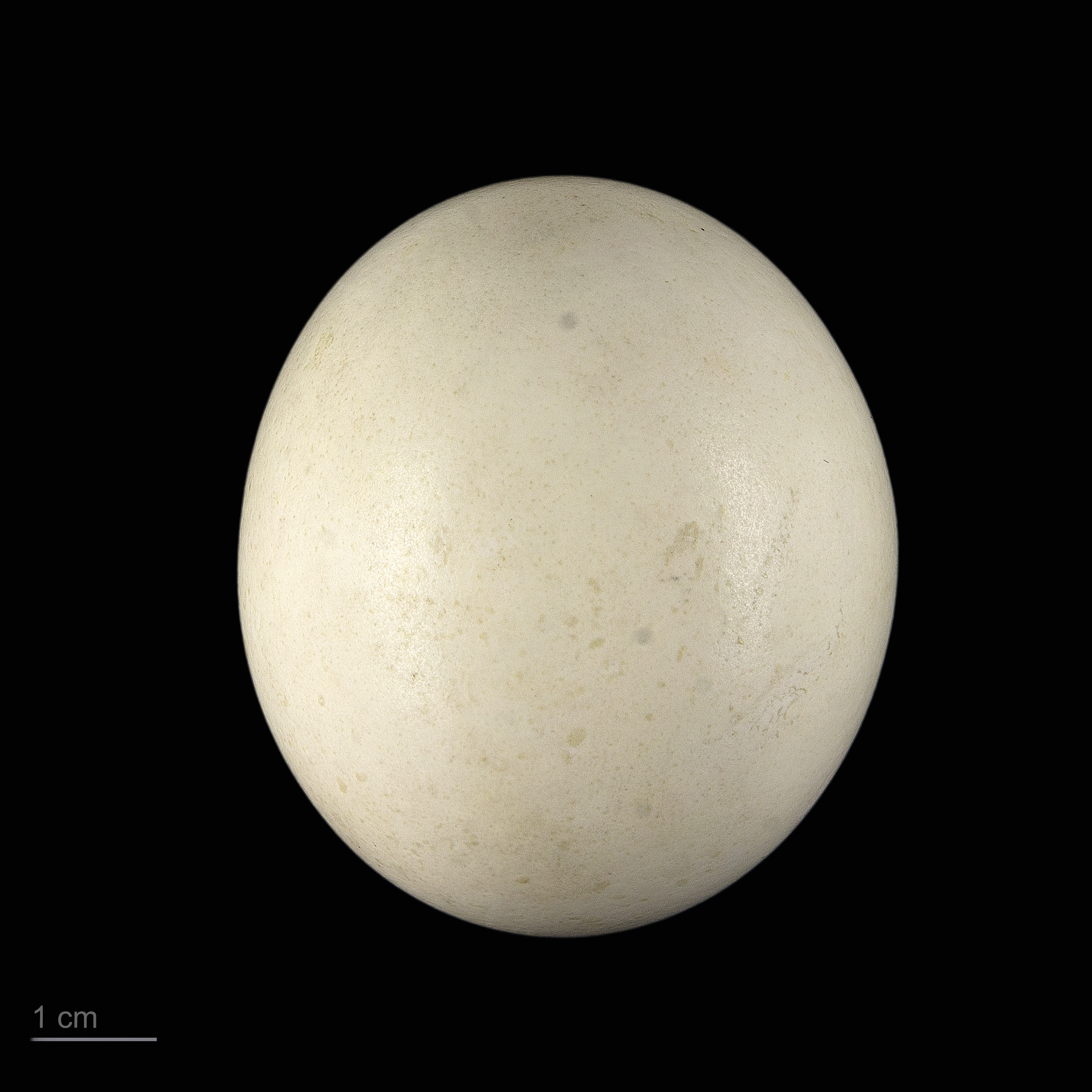
Egg of the Pharaoh eagle-owl

The Pharaoh eagle-owl has a very large range and is reported as being abundant in at least part of the range. It faces no particular threats, and is therefore listed as Least Concern on the IUCN Red List.
