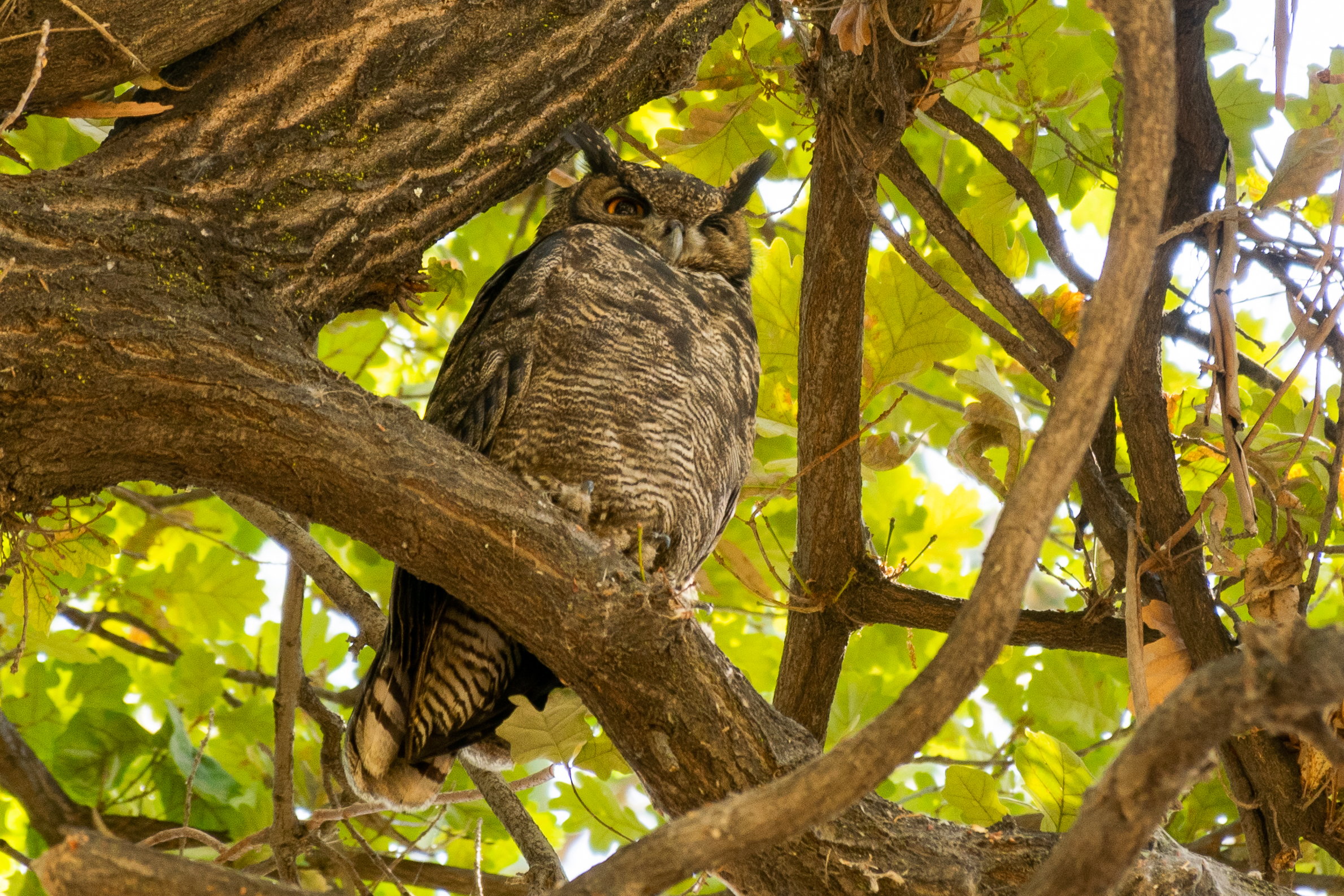

Conservation status
- Least Concern (IUCN 3.1)
- CITES Appendix II

Scientific classification
- Kingdom: Animalia
- Phylum: Chordata
- Class: Aves
- Order: Strigiformes
- Family: Strigidae
- Genus: Bubo
- Species: B. magellanicus

Binomial name
- Bubo magellanicus (Lesson, 1828)
- Range

= Magellanic horned owl =

Species of owl

The Magellanic horned owl or lesser horned owl (Bubo magellanicus) is a large owl of the genus Bubo found in southern South America, extending north to the central Andes. It has traditionally been classified as a subspecies of the great horned owl (Bubo virginianus), but is now treated as a separate species based on differences in voice and size and because of the genetic distance between the two.

It is about 45 cm (18 in) long with birds in the north of the range being largest. It has broad wings and a large head with two "ear" tufts. The plumage is mainly grey-brown but is quite variable in colour. The underparts are pale with narrow grey-brown bars and the breast has dark blotches. There is a black border to the facial disc and white stripes above the yellow eyes. The great horned owl is similar but larger with stronger feet and bill, broader bars on the underparts and longer ear-tufts.

The deep hooting call consists of a double-note followed by a loud, vibrating note. The bird's local name tucúquere is imitative of the call.

The range extends from central Peru and western Bolivia southwards through Chile and western Argentina as far as Tierra del Fuego. The bird occurs in a variety of habitats including open forest, scrubland, farmland and grassland. It hunts over open country, mainly at night. Rodents make up most of the diet but other mammals, birds, reptiles and insects are also taken. The species nests on cliffs or between rocks. The two or three eggs are incubated by the female, who is fed by the male.
